= Y linkage =

Traits produced by genes located on the Y chromosome

Y-linked inheritance

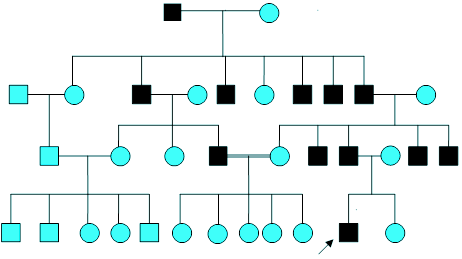
Pedigree tree showing the inheritance of a Y-linked trait

Y linkage, also known as holandric inheritance (from Ancient Greek ὅλος hólos, "whole" + ἀνδρός andrós, "male"), describes traits that are produced by genes located on the Y chromosome. It is a form of sex linkage.

Y linkage can be difficult to detect. This is partly because the Y chromosome is small and contains fewer genes than the autosomal chromosomes or the X chromosome. It is estimated to contain about 200 genes. It was thought that the human Y chromosome has little importance. While the Y-chromosome is sex-determining in humans and some other species, not all genes that play a role in sex determination are Y-linked. The Y-chromosome, generally does not undergo genetic recombination except at small pseudoautosomal regions. The majority of the Y-chromosome genes that do not recombine are located in the "non-recombining region".

For a trait to be considered Y linkage, it must exhibit the following characteristics:

- occurs only in males
- appears in all sons of males who exhibit that trait
- is absent from daughters of trait carriers; instead the daughters are phenotypically normal and do not have affected offspring.

These requirements were established by the pioneer of Y linkage, Curt Stern. Stern detailed in his paper genes he suspected to be Y-linked. His requirements at first made Y linkage hard to prove. In the 1950s using human pedigrees, many genes were incorrectly determined to be Y-linked. Later research adopted more advanced techniques and more sophisticated statistical analysis. Hairy ears are an example of a gene once thought to be Y-linked in humans; however, that hypothesis was discredited. Due to advancements in DNA sequencing, Y linkage is getting easier to determine and prove. The Y-chromosome has been entirely mapped, revealing many Y-linked traits.

Y linkage is similar to, but different from X linkage; although, both are forms of sex linkage. X linkage can be genetically linked and sex-linked, while Y linkage can only be genetically linked. This is because males' cells have only one copy of the Y-chromosome. X-chromosomes have two copies, one from each parent permitting recombination. The X chromosome contains more genes and is substantially larger.

Some ostensibly Y-linked traits have not been confirmed. One example is Y-linked hearing impairment. Hearing impairment was tracked in one specific family and through seven generations all males were affected by this trait. However, this trait occurs rarely and has not been entirely resolved.

Y-chromosome deletions are a frequent genetic cause of male infertility.

== Y-linkage in non-human animals ==
=== Guppies ===
In guppies, Y-linked genes help determine sex selection. This is done indirectly by traits that allow the guppy to appear more attractive to a prospective mate. These traits were shown to be on the Y-chromosome and thus Y-linked. Also in guppies, it appears that the four measures of sexual activity is Y-linked.

=== Rats ===
Hypertension, or high blood pressure, appears to be Y-linked in the hypertensive rat. One locus was autosomal. However, the second component appeared to be Y-linked. This held through the third generation of rats. Male offspring with a hypertensive father had significantly higher blood pressure than male offspring with a hypertensive mother indicating that a component of the trait was Y-linked. The results were not the same in females as in males, further hinting at a Y-component.

== Genes on the human Y chromosome ==
In general, traits that exist on the Y chromosome are Y-linked because they only occur on that chromosome and do not change in recombination.

As of 2000, a number of genes were known to be Y-linked, including:

- ASMTY (acetylserotonin methyltransferase),
- TSPY (testis-specific protein),
- IL3RAY (interleukin-3 receptor),
- SRY (sex-determining region),
- ZFY (zinc finger protein),
- PRKY (protein kinase, Y-linked),
- AMELY (amelogenin, Y-linked),
- ANT3Y (adenine nucleotide translocator-3 on the Y),
- AZF2 (azoospermia factor 2),
- BPY2 (basic protein on the Y chromosome),
- AZF1 (azoospermia factor 1),
- DAZ (Spermatogenes is deleted in azoospermia),
- RBM1 (RNA binding motif protein, Y chromosome, family 1, member A1),
- RBM2 (RNA binding motif protein 2),
- UTY (ubiquitously transcribed TPR gene on Y chromosome), and
- USP9Y.

== Y-linked conditions ==
- Y-linked deafness, type 1

== See also ==
- Genetic linkage
- Sex linkage
- X linkage
