= DBY =

DBY can refer to:

- Darby Bible
- Derbyshire in England — DBY is the Chapman code for that county
- Derby railway station, whose station code is "DBY"
- Devil Beside You, a Taiwanese drama starring Rainie Yang and Mike He
- DBY, an alias for the enzyme encoded by the DDX3Y gene
- Dalby Airport, IATA airport code "DBY"
