= ZFX =

Protein-coding gene in the species Homo sapiens

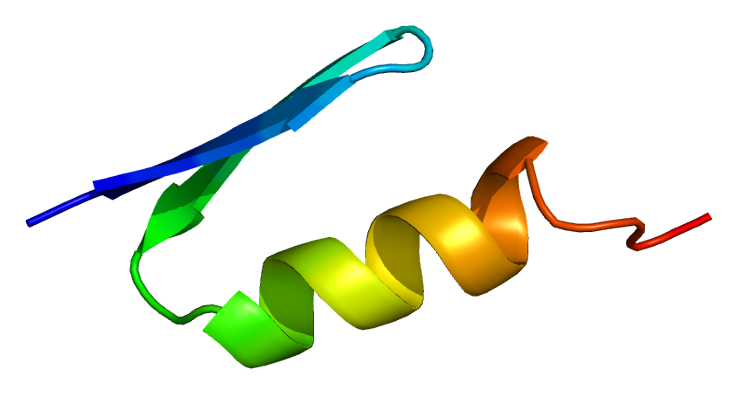

Identifiers
- Aliases: ZFX, ZNF926, zinc finger protein, X-linked, zinc finger protein X-linked
- External IDs: OMIM: 314980; MGI: 99211; GeneCards: ZFX

Gene location (Human)
Chr.	X chromosome (human)
Band	Xp22.11	Start	24,149,173 bp
Band	Xp22.11	End	24,216,255 bp

Gene location (Mouse)
Chr.	X chromosome (mouse)
Band	X C3|X 41.48 cM	Start	93,118,237 bp
Band	X C3|X 41.48 cM	End	93,167,308 bp
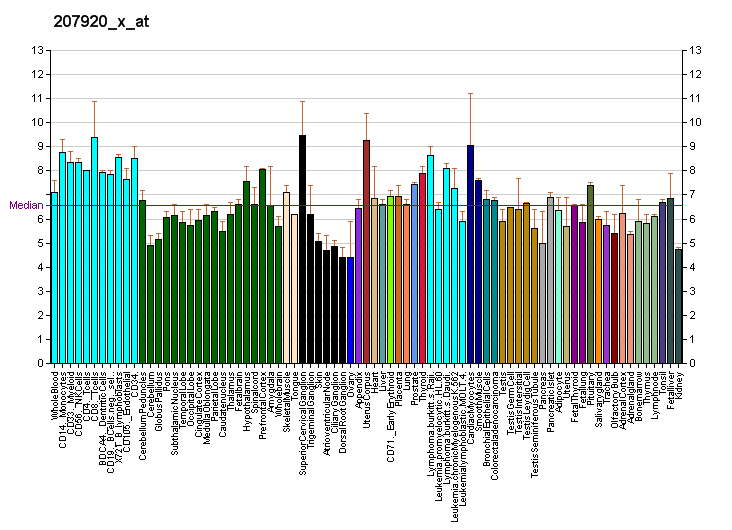

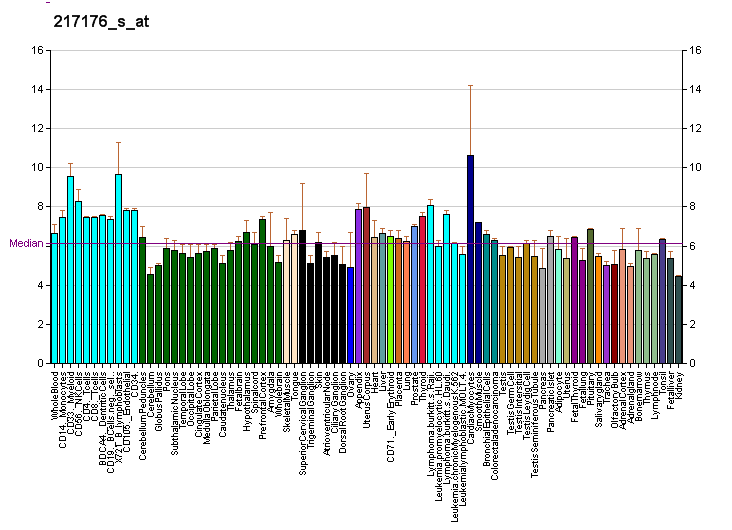

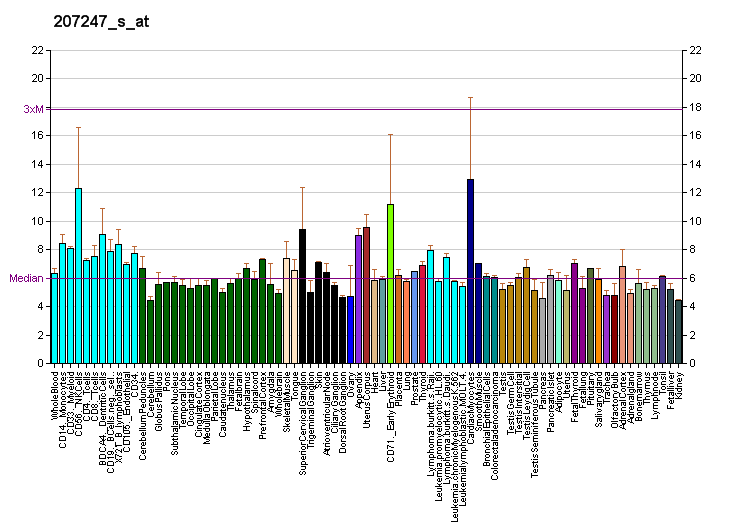
RNA expression pattern
Bgee	Human / Mouse (ortholog); Top expressed in: Achilles tendon; sural nerve; germinal epithelium; epithelium of colon; monocyte; Skeletal muscle tissue of rectus abdominis; testicle; stromal cell of endometrium; tibia; Skeletal muscle tissue of biceps brachii / Top expressed in: medullary collecting duct; renal corpuscle; ciliary body; vestibular sensory epithelium; medial ganglionic eminence; ureter; Ileal epithelium; iris; primitive streak; left lung lobe; More reference expression data
BioGPS	More reference expression data
Gene ontology
Molecular function	DNA binding; transcription coactivator activity; metal ion binding; nucleic acid binding; DNA-binding transcription factor activity, RNA polymerase II-specific
Cellular component	nucleus; nucleoplasm; nucleolus
Biological process	multicellular organism development; transcription, DNA-templated; regulation of transcription, DNA-templated; regulation of transcription by RNA polymerase II; positive regulation of nucleic acid-templated transcription; ovarian follicle development; germ cell development; spermatogenesis; fertilization; post-embryonic development; multicellular organism growth; oocyte development; homeostasis of number of cells; parental care
Sources:Amigo / QuickGO
Orthologs
Databases	NCBI: entry; OMA: entry
Species	Human	Mouse
Entrez	7543	22764
Ensembl	ENSG00000005889	ENSMUSG00000079509
UniProt	P17010	P17012
RefSeq (mRNA)	NM_001178084; NM_001178085; NM_001178086; NM_001178095; NM_003410 NM_001330327	NM_001044386; NM_011768; NM_001358354; NM_001358355; NM_001358356 NM_001358357
RefSeq (protein)	NP_001171555; NP_001171556; NP_001171557; NP_001171566; NP_001317256 NP_003401	NP_001037851; NP_035898; NP_001345283; NP_001345284; NP_001345285 NP_001345286
Location (UCSC)	Chr X: 24.15 – 24.22 Mb	Chr X: 93.12 – 93.17 Mb
PubMed search
- Wikidata
View/Edit Human	View/Edit Mouse

Zinc finger X-chromosomal protein is a protein that in mammals is encoded by the ZFX gene of the X chromosome.

== Gene ==
Multiple alternatively spliced transcript variants encoding different isoforms have been identified, but the full-length nature of some variants has not been determined. [provided by RefSeq, May 2010]

== Structure ==
This gene on the X chromosome is structurally similar to a related gene on the Y chromosome (ZFY). It encodes a member of the krüppel C2H2-type zinc-finger protein family. The full-length protein contains an acidic transcriptional activation domain (AD), a nuclear localization sequence (NLS) and a DNA binding domain (DBD) consisting of 13 C2H2-type zinc fingers.

== Function ==
Studies in mouse embryonic and adult hematopoietic stem cells showed that this gene was required as a transcriptional regulator for self-renewal of both stem cell types, but it was dispensable for growth and differentiation of their progeny.

== Clinical significance ==
The gene is associated with X-linked neurodevelopmental disorder, and is implicated in autism spectrum disorder.

== See also ==
- Kruppel-like factors
