= Y chromosome =

Sex chromosome in the XY sex-determination system

Human Y chromosome
- Human Y chromosome (after G-banding)

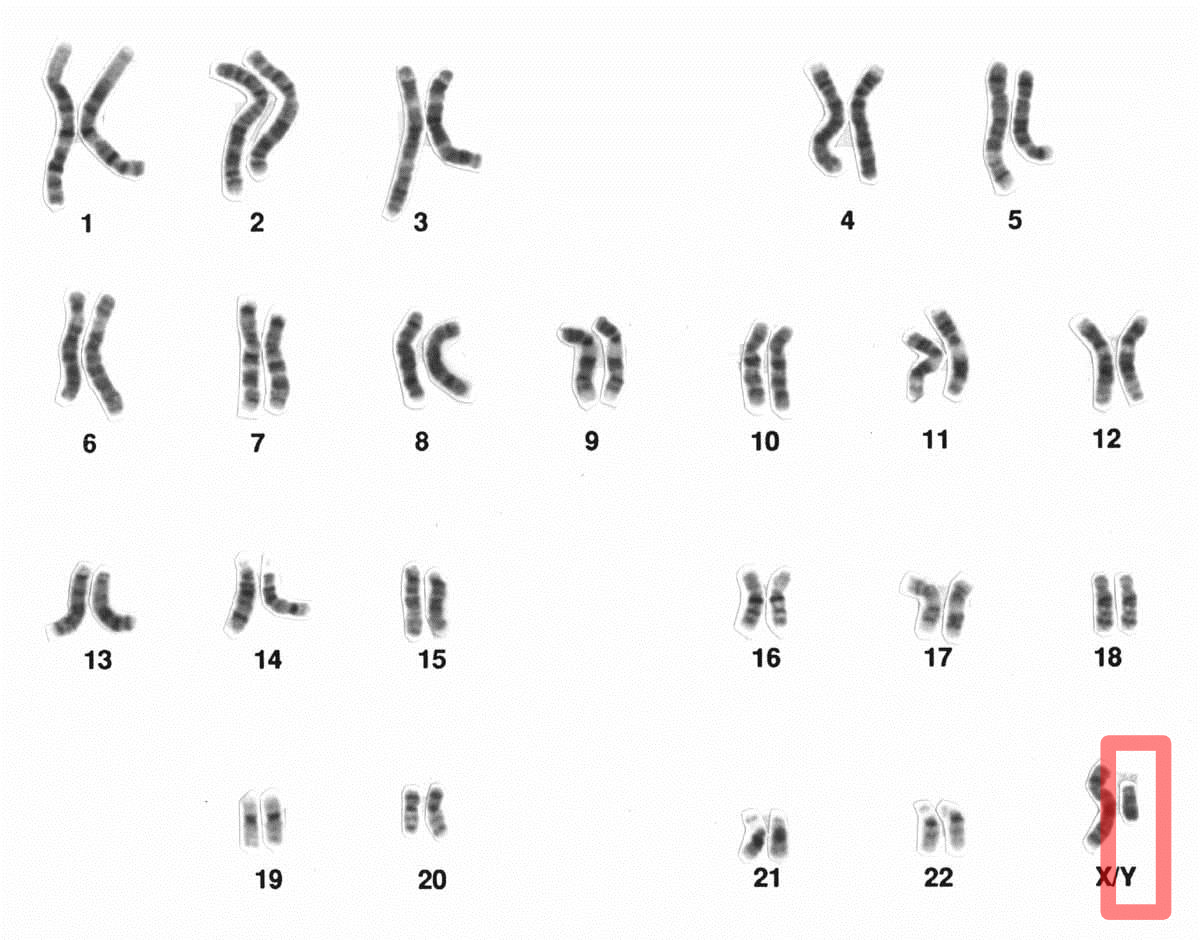
- Y chromosome in human male karyogram

Features
- Length (bp): 62,460,029 bp (CHM13)
- No. of genes: 106 protein-coding; 693 total (T2T-CHM13v2.0); 63 (CCDS)
- Type: Allosome
- Centromere position: Acrocentric (10.4 Mbp)

Complete gene lists
- CCDS: Gene list
- HGNC: Gene list
- UniProt: Gene list
- NCBI: Gene list

External map viewers
- Ensembl: Chromosome Y
- Entrez: Chromosome Y
- NCBI: Chromosome Y
- UCSC: Chromosome Y

Full DNA sequences
- RefSeq: NC_000024 (FASTA)
- GenBank: CM000686 (FASTA)

The Y chromosome is one of two sex chromosomes in therian mammals and other organisms. Along with the X chromosome, it is part of the XY sex-determination system, in which the Y is used for sex-determining as the presence of the Y chromosome typically causes offspring produced in sexual reproduction to develop phenotypically male. In mammals, the Y chromosome contains the SRY gene, which usually triggers the differentiation of male gonads. The Y chromosome is typically only passed from male parents to male offspring.

In humans, the complete 62.46-megabase Y chromosome (sequenced end-to-end by the Telomere-to-Telomere Consortium in 2023) contains 693 genes, including 106 protein-coding genes grouped into 42 gene families and single-copy regions. Its total length varies nearly twofold—from 45.2 to 84.9 megabases across globally diverse men—because a large block of repetitive, non-coding satellite DNA on its long arm (Yq12) expands and contracts across lineages. Because the MSY cannot swap DNA with the X chromosome to fix genetic damage, it maintains its multi-copy genes using nine large mirror-image DNA palindromes (P1 through P9) and tandem repeat arrays. These structures fold back on themselves so that an intact gene copy on one arm can overwrite and repair a mutated copy on the opposite arm through intra-chromosomal gene conversion.

In addition to genes that trigger testis development and sperm production, natural selection has preserved a core group of single-copy Y-chromosome genes that survived from the ancient autosome shared with the X chromosome (X-degenerate genes, including UTY, KDM5D, ZFY, DDX3Y, EIF1AY, RPS4Y1, USP9Y, TBL1Y, TMSB4Y, and NLGN4Y). Unlike sperm-production genes, these genes are active in non-reproductive tissues throughout the body. Human cells require two working copies of these dosage-sensitive regulatory genes: in 46,XX females, their X-chromosome counterparts escape X-inactivation, whereas in 46,XY males, the Y chromosome supplies the required second copy (without a second sex chromosome, more than 99% of 45,X embryos miscarry). These Y-linked regulators also control the activity of hundreds of genes across the 22 non-sex chromosomes (autosomes). As men age, dividing body cells can lose the Y chromosome, a condition known as mosaic loss of the Y chromosome (mLOY) and the most common acquired genetic mutation in males. In epidemiological studies, blood mLOY is associated with shorter survival and higher risks of cardiovascular, cancerous, and neurodegenerative diseases, while animal and cellular studies link Y-chromosome loss in immune and tumor cells to TGF-β1-driven heart muscle scarring, T-cell exhaustion in tumors, and microglial brain inflammation.

== Overview ==
=== Discovery ===
The Y chromosome was identified as a sex-determining chromosome by Nettie Stevens at Bryn Mawr College in 1905 during a study of the mealworm Tenebrio molitor. Edmund Beecher Wilson independently discovered the same mechanisms the same year, working with Hemiptera. Stevens proposed that chromosomes always existed in pairs and that the smaller chromosome (now labelled "Y") was the pair of the X chromosome discovered in 1890 by Hermann Henking. She realized that the previous idea of Clarence Erwin McClung, that the X chromosome determines sex, was wrong and that sex determination is, in fact, due to the presence or absence of the Y chromosome. In the early 1920s, Theophilus Painter determined that X and Y chromosomes determined sex in humans (and other mammals).

The chromosome was given the name "Y" simply to follow on from Henking's "X" alphabetically. The idea that the Y chromosome was named after its similarity in appearance to the letter "Y" is mistaken. All chromosomes normally appear as an amorphous blob under the microscope and only take on a well-defined shape during mitosis. This shape is vaguely X-shaped for all chromosomes. It is entirely coincidental that the Y chromosome, during mitosis, has two very short branches which can look merged under the microscope and appear as the descender of a Y-shape.

=== Different variations ===
Most therian mammals have only one pair of sex chromosomes in each cell. Males usually have one Y chromosome and one X chromosome, while females usually have two X chromosomes. In mammals, the Y chromosome contains the SRY gene which triggers phenotypic male development. Differences in the Y chromosome are associated with both atypical sexual development and fertility conditions.

In humans, people with an extra X chromosome often develop Klinefelter syndrome, and people with an extra Y chromosome develop Jacob's Syndrome, as genes on the Y chromosome generally trigger the development of a male phenotype. Other chromosomal variations include three X chromosomes (or Trisomy X), and Monosomy X (or Turner Syndrome), where individuals only have one X chromosome and no Y chromosome. Some individuals with an XY karyotype develop phenotypically female due to mutation in genes such as the SRY gene or MAP3K1. In Turner syndrome (45,X monosomy, in which an embryo has a single X chromosome and no second sex chromosome), more than 99% of conceived 45,X fetuses miscarry during early pregnancy, accounting for about 10% of all first-trimester human miscarriages. Early embryonic development requires two working copies of the dosage-sensitive regulatory genes shared between the X chromosome and the X-degenerate regions of the Y chromosome. Individuals with 45,X Turner syndrome who survive to birth often have mosaicism, meaning that a fraction of cells in the fetus or placenta still carry a second sex chromosome (such as 45,X/46,XX or 45,X/46,XY).

== Human Y chromosome ==
The human Y chromosome contains an average of about 57.6 million base pairs of DNA across global populations. In the complete, gapless T2T-CHM13v2.0 reference assembly, it measures 62,460,029 base pairs, while its length among healthy men ranges from 37.3 million to 84.9 million base pairs. It is similar in size to chromosome 19 and makes up roughly 0.9% to 1% of the total diploid DNA in a male cell. The chromosome carries 693 genes, 106 of which are protein-coding (generating 488 protein-coding RNA transcripts out of 883 total transcripts). Because several testis-specific genes are repeated many times in head-to-tail (tandem) and mirror-image (palindromic) arrays, these 106 protein-coding copies belong to 42 distinct gene families and single-copy genes. Before the chromosome was fully sequenced, the Consensus Coding Sequence (CCDS) Project had classified 63 out of 107 predicted genes.

Because typical males carry only one Y chromosome, all single-copy Y-linked genes are hemizygous (present in a single copy per cell), except in conditions with extra sex chromosomes (aneuploidy) such as XYY syndrome or XXYY syndrome. Traits inherited through the Y chromosome are called Y-linked traits, or holandric traits (from Ancient Greek ὅλος hólos, "whole" + ἀνδρός andrós, "male").

=== Sequence of the human Y chromosome ===
When the Human Genome Project concluded, and through subsequent updates up to 2021, more than half of the Y chromosome remained unsequenced because standard sequencing tools could not assemble its long, nearly identical repeat blocks. In the GRCh38 reference assembly (based mainly on European haplogroup R-L20), 53.8% of the Y chromosome (30,812,366 bases out of 57,264,655 total bases across 56 gaps, plus 37,240 unlocalized bases) consisted of blank placeholder sequences spanning the centromere, complex multi-copy (ampliconic) repeats, and the large tightly packed (heterochromatic) region at the end of the long arm (Yq12).

In August 2023, the Telomere-to-Telomere Consortium published the first complete, end-to-end sequence of a human Y chromosome (T2T-Y) in Nature, using the HG002 (GM24385) genome (haplogroup J-L816 / J1a2b3a1). By combining accurate Pacific Biosciences (PacBio) high-fidelity (HiFi) reads with ultra-long Oxford Nanopore Technologies (ONT) reads that spanned entire repetitive blocks, the consortium incorporated T2T-Y into the gapless human reference genome T2T-CHM13v2.0 with an estimated error rate below 1 error per 10 megabases (Phred Q73.8). The complete assembly resolved 62,460,029 base pairs and added more than 30 million base pairs of previously missing DNA. It raised the total number of annotated Y genes by 17.7% (from 589 in GRCh38-Y to 693 in T2T-Y) and increased known protein-coding genes by 60.6% (from 66 to 106, adding 41 newly mapped protein-coding gene copies). Because 84.9% of T2T-Y (53,004,524 base pairs) is repetitive sequence, only 14,363,623 base pairs (23.0% of the chromosome) can be mapped without ambiguity using conventional short-read DNA sequencing.

Nearly all of the newly mapped protein-coding gene copies lie within the TSPY (testis-specific protein Y-encoded) repeat array on the short arm. Where GRCh38-Y contained a large gap and listed only 25 total TSPY copies (7 protein-coding), T2T-Y revealed a continuous array of 66 total TSPY copies, including 45 protein-coding genes (44 in the main tandem array plus a single diverged copy, TSPY2). T2T-Y also mapped the full copy counts of the chromosome's other repeated gene families: RBMY (34 total copies, including 6 protein-coding and 4 transcribed pseudogenes), DAZ (4 protein-coding copies), BPY2 (4 total, 3 coding), CDY (26 total, 4 coding), HSFY (8 total, 2 coding), PRY (8 total, 2 coding), VCY (2 total, 2 coding), and XKRY (8 total, 2 transcribed pseudogenes). In the Yq12 heterochromatic block, the assembly resolved 14.52 Mb of satellite DNA (including 14.2 Mb of HSat1B/DYZ2) and 21.57 Mb of simple repeats (including 21.7 Mb of HSat3/DYZ1).

Alongside T2T-Y in August 2023, the Human Genome Structural Variation Consortium (HGSVC) assembled 43 human Y chromosomes from diverse populations, half of which belonged to early-branching African haplogroups (A0b, A1a, B2b, and E). A follow-up pangenome study by the Human Pangenome Reference Consortium (HPRC) and HGSVC expanded this dataset to 142 near-complete Y assemblies across 17 major haplogroups. Across the 43-Y global group, total Y chromosome length varied nearly twofold, ranging from 45.2 million to 84.9 million base pairs (mean 57.6 Mbp, median 55.7 Mbp). More than 90% of this size difference comes from expansion and contraction of the Yq12 heterochromatic block (which ranges from 17.6 to 37.2 Mbp in the 43-Y cohort), with smaller variations in the pericentromeric DYZ3/DYZ17 region (2.0 to 3.1 Mbp) and the DYZ19 repeat array (63.5 to 428 kbp).

Because the >30 Mbp of HSat1B/DYZ2 and HSat3/DYZ1 satellite repeats in Yq12 were missing from human reference genomes prior to 2022, automated software could not recognize and filter them out as human DNA contamination when sequencing bacteria sampled from human patients. In 2023, researchers found that thousands of bacterial genome entries in the NCBI RefSeq database mistakenly contained human Y chromosome satellite sequences.

==== High germline de novo mutation accumulation ====
Although the Y chromosome represents only ~0.9% to 1% of a man's diploid genome, it accumulates a disproportionately high percentage of new germline mutations (de novo mutations, or DNMs) in each generation. Across the entire human genome, 75% to 81% of all new germline mutations come from the father because sperm precursor cells (spermatogonial stem cells) divide continuously by mitosis throughout adult life, adding DNA copying errors with age. Across generations, non-sex chromosomes (autosomes) alternate equally between female and male bodies, and the X chromosome spends two-thirds of its transmissions in females, where fewer mutations arise. In contrast, the Y chromosome passes strictly from father to son. It remains entirely within the sperm-producing male germline every generation, and 84.9% of its sequence consists of mutation-prone repetitive DNA.

In April 2025, near-complete sequencing of a four-generation, 28-member human reference family (CEPH 1463) measured an average of 192 total de novo mutations per generation across the whole diploid genome (including single-base changes, small insertions and deletions, tandem repeats, centromeres, and the Y chromosome). In father-to-son transmissions, the Y chromosome alone averaged 12.4 new mutation events per generation, or 6.46% (12.4 of 192) of all new germline mutations. Because the male-specific region of the Y chromosome (MSY) does not swap DNA with another chromosome during meiosis, it retains both single-base mutations (more than 140,000 genealogical SNPs mapped worldwide) and megabase-scale repeat expansions and contractions in Yq12 and multi-copy gene arrays along each paternal line.

=== Structure ===
==== Cytogenetic band ====
G-banding ideograms of human Y chromosome

G-banding ideogram of human Y chromosome in resolution 850 bphs. Band length in this diagram is proportional to base-pair length. This type of ideogram is generally used in genome browsers (e.g., Ensembl, UCSC Genome Browser).

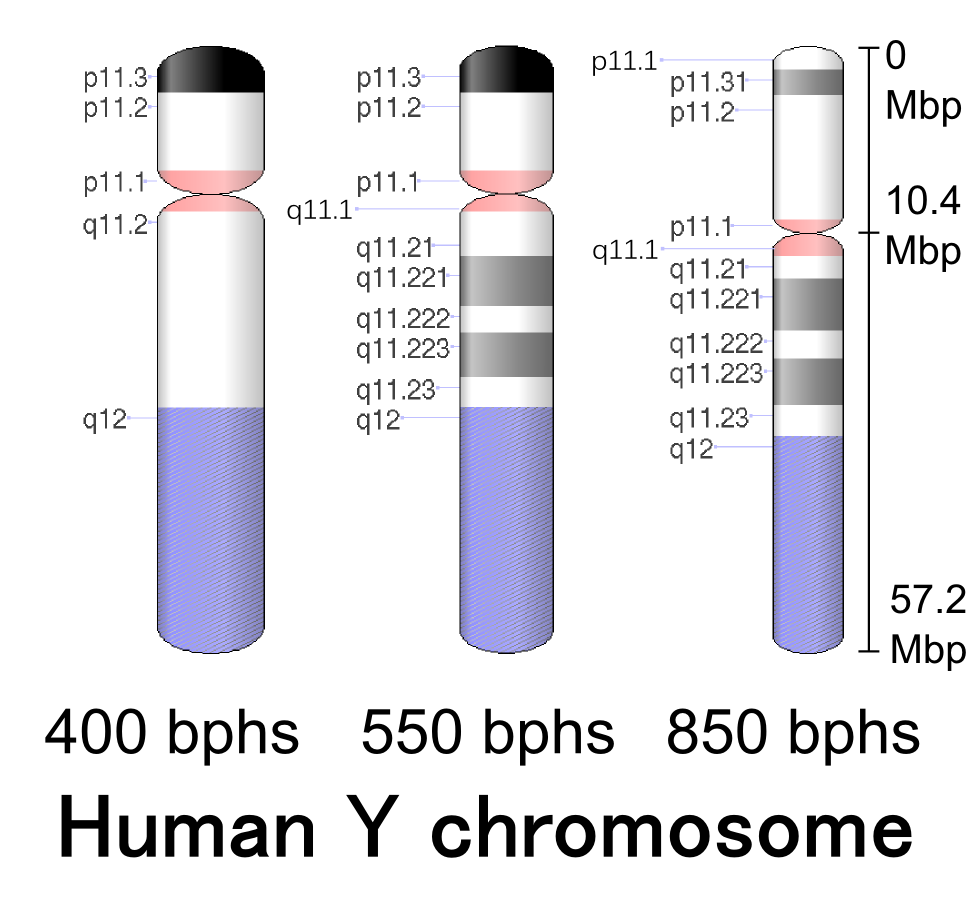
G-banding patterns of human Y chromosome in three different resolutions (400, 550 and 850). Band length in this diagram is based on the ideograms from ISCN (2013). This type of ideogram represents actual relative band length observed under a microscope at the different moments during the mitotic process.

G-bands of human Y chromosome in resolution 850 bphs
Chr.	Arm	Band	ISCN start	ISCN stop	Basepair start	Basepair stop	Stain	Density
Y	p	11.32	0	149	1	300,000	gneg	
Y	p	11.31	149	298	300,001	600,000	gpos	50
Y	p	11.2	298	1043	600,001	10,300,000	gneg	
Y	p	11.1	1043	1117	10,300,001	10,400,000	acen	
Y	q	11.1	1117	1266	10,400,001	10,600,000	acen	
Y	q	11.21	1266	1397	10,600,001	12,400,000	gneg	
Y	q	11.221	1397	1713	12,400,001	17,100,000	gpos	50
Y	q	11.222	1713	1881	17,100,001	19,600,000	gneg	
Y	q	11.223	1881	2160	19,600,001	23,800,000	gpos	50
Y	q	11.23	2160	2346	23,800,001	26,600,000	gneg	
Y	q	12	2346	3650	26,600,001	57,227,415	gvar	

==== Non-combining region of Y (NRY) ====
The human Y chromosome cannot recombine (swap DNA) with the X chromosome along most of its length, except within two small pseudoautosomal regions (PAR1 and PAR2) at the chromosome tips (telomeres), which together make up about 5% of the chromosome. These two tips are surviving remnants of ancient sequence similarity between the X and Y chromosomes. The remaining 95% of the chromosome that does not recombine is called the "NRY" (non-recombining region of the Y chromosome) or the "MSY" (male-specific region of the Y chromosome). Single-nucleotide polymorphisms (SNPs) within this non-recombining region are used to trace direct paternal ancestry.

In the older GRCh38 assembly, PAR1 spanned positions 0.1 to 2.7 Mb and PAR2 spanned 56.9 to 57.2 Mb, with the NRY/MSY between them. In the complete T2T-CHM13v2.0 assembly, their exact lengths are 2.77 Mb for PAR1 and 329.5 kb for PAR2. Before T2T-CHM13v2.0, the reference sequences for PAR1 and PAR2 on the Y chromosome had simply been copied over from the X chromosome rather than sequenced directly from a Y chromosome. Assemblies from multiple men in 2023 also showed that the actual boundary where X–Y recombination stops in PAR1 sits roughly 500 kbp closer to the chromosome tip than the old reference boundary.

Genes in PAR1 escape X-inactivation on a woman's silenced X chromosome (Xi), but they are transcribed at lower levels from Xi than from a woman's active X chromosome (Xa) or a man's Y chromosome. A May 2025 study of 928,605 adults (including 1,225 people with abnormal sex chromosome counts in the Geisinger MyCode, NIH All of Us, and UK Biobank cohorts) examined how this difference affects human height. Because the PAR1 bone-growth gene SHOX (short stature homeobox) is partially silenced on Xi in 46,XX women but fully active on both Xa and the Y chromosome in 46,XY men, carrying a Y chromosome adds an average of 3.1 cm (95% confidence interval: 1.9 to 4.3 cm) more adult height than carrying an Xi chromosome. This gene-dosage effect operates independently of sex hormones and accounts for 22.6% of the average 13 cm height difference between adult men and women.

==== Sequence classes ====
The euchromatic (loosely packed, gene-active) portion of the male-specific region (MSY) covers roughly 23 to 24 megabases. It is divided into three structural and sequence classes, followed on the far end of the long arm by a fourth region, the large block of constitutive heterochromatin (tightly packed repeat DNA) at Yq12:

- X-transposed sequences (about 3.4 Mbp total) originated 3 to 6 million years ago, after the human and chimpanzee lineages split, when a DNA segment was copied from the X chromosome (at band Xq21.3) onto the Y short arm (Yp11.2). A subsequent inversion on the short arm split this block into two separate segments. X-transposed sequences still share about 99% sequence identity with Xq21.3, but they do not recombine with the X chromosome (disproving a 2013 proposal that they formed a third pseudoautosomal region, "PAR3"). They have the lowest gene density of the three euchromatic classes and contain only two protein-coding genes: PCDH11Y and TGIF2LY.
- X-degenerate sequences (about 8.6 Mbp total) are surviving remnants of the ancient non-sex chromosomes (autosomes) from which the X and Y chromosomes evolved. They share between 60% and 96% sequence identity with their partner genes on the X chromosome. Most X-degenerate genes are single-copy regulatory and cellular maintenance ("housekeeping") genes that are active in non-reproductive (somatic) tissues throughout the body (including UTY, KDM5D, ZFY, DDX3Y, EIF1AY, RPS4Y1, USP9Y, TBL1Y, TMSB4Y, NLGN4Y, AMELY, and the transcribed pseudogene TXLNGY). This class also includes the male sex-determining gene SRY.
- Ampliconic sequences (about 10.2 Mbp total) consist of long repeated blocks of DNA (amplicons) that are more than 99.9% identical to their partner copies elsewhere on the Y chromosome. They are arranged into nine large inverted-repeat palindromes (labeled P1 through P9, whose mirror-image arms range from 9 kbp to 1.45 Mbp and are separated by short central spacers) as well as long head-to-tail tandem arrays, such as the TSPY array (AMPL2) on the short arm and the RBMY array on the long arm. Ampliconic DNA has the highest density of coding and non-coding genes on the Y chromosome. It contains nine multi-copy protein-coding gene families active mainly or exclusively in the testes (TSPY, RBMY, DAZ, CDY, BPY2, HSFY, PRY, VCY, and XKRY) along with many TTTY (testis-specific transcript, Y-linked) non-coding RNA genes. Inside the 45-copy coding TSPY array (AMPL2), each 20.4 kbp repeat unit pairs a TSPY protein-coding gene with a neighboring non-coding RNA gene (FAM197Y) and is flanked by epigenetic boundary markers (DNA methylation, promoter H3K4me3 histone marks, and reverse-oriented CTCF binding sites). The number of ampliconic gene copies varies among paternal lineages and affects sperm production: RBMY1 coding copies differ by 40% across haplogroups (from 6 coding copies in haplogroup R1b to 10 copies in haplogroup E1b1b), while a study of 2,794 men found that TSPY copy counts must stay within an intermediate range, as men with fewer than 21 copies or more than 55 copies had lower sperm counts and higher rates of oligozoospermia.
- Constitutive heterochromatin (Yq12 and pericentromeric satellites, averaging 27.6 Mbp and varying from 17.6 to 37.2 Mbp across the 43-Y global cohort) forms the largest continuous block of constitutive heterochromatin in the human genome. Complete T2T assemblies showed that Yq12 is built from alternating blocks of two satellite repeat families: DYZ1 (a ~3.56 kbp repeat belonging to human satellite 3 subfamily HSat3-A6, derived from an ancestral Y-centromeric HSat3-A4/DYZ18 repeat) and DYZ2 (a ~2.47 kbp repeat belonging to human satellite 1B [HSat1B], originally acquired from the centromere-adjacent regions of autosomes 13, 14, and 21). Although internal DYZ1 and DYZ2 blocks expand and shrink between individuals, conserved inversions at the outer edges of Yq12 limit unequal DNA exchange, keeping the overall ratio of DYZ1 to DYZ2 repeat units near 1:1 across populations. When cells experience heat or chemical stress, HSat3 satellite repeats actively transcribe non-coding RNAs that pull together nuclear stress bodies (nSBs); these structures gather splicing enzymes to adjust the pre-mRNA splicing of hundreds of genes across the cell nucleus.

=== Genes ===
==== Number of genes ====
Older gene counts for the human Y chromosome relied on incomplete assemblies that missed large multi-copy repeat arrays. The complete gene count was established only with the gapless T2T-Y assembly in 2023.

Estimated by	Protein-coding genes	Non-coding RNA genes	Pseudogenes	Source	Release date
CCDS	63	None listed	None listed		2016-09-08
HGNC	45	55	381		2017-05-12
Ensembl	63	109	392		2017-03-29
UniProt	47	None listed	None listed		2018-02-28
NCBI	73	122	400		2017-05-19
T2T	106 (488 coding transcripts)	587 non-coding RNA genes and pseudogenes (693 total genes; 883 total transcripts)	Included in 587		2023-08-23

==== Gene list ====
Because so much of its length is taken up by the Yq12 repeat block, the human Y chromosome has a low density of unique single-copy genes and was once described as a gene desert. Its 106 protein-coding genes and 587 non-coding genes are nevertheless required for both sperm production and gene regulation across tissues throughout the body. Excluding pseudoautosomal genes shared with the tip of the X chromosome (noted separately at the bottom of the table), major genes and regions on the non-recombining Y chromosome include:

Genes on the non-recombining portion of the Y chromosome
Name	X paralog	Note
SRY	SOX3	Sex-determining region Y on the short arm [Yp11.2]. Encodes an HMG-box transcription factor protein that bends DNA by 60 to 85 degrees to switch on SOX9 and trigger testis development in the embryo; also regulates dopamine and catecholamine production in the adult midbrain.
ZFY	ZFX	Zinc finger transcription factor on Yp11.2. Expressed in tissues throughout the body; drives 56% to 59% of the Y chromosome's regulation of non-sex chromosome (autosomal) genes in human CD4+ T cells and monocytes.
RPS4Y1	RPS4X	40S ribosomal protein S4 on Yp11.2. A protein-synthesis subunit expressed across the body that also regulates STAT3 signaling in placental trophoblasts and p38 MAPK signaling in blood vessel endothelial cells.
AMELY	AMELX	Amelogenin on Yp11.2. Extracellular matrix protein involved in tooth enamel mineralization; widely used in forensics to determine whether a DNA sample is male or female.
TBL1Y	TBL1X	Transducin beta-like 1, Y-linked on Yp11.2. Chromatin-regulating protein (with WD40 repeats) that helps release the Notch corepressor CtBP during heart muscle cell development; variants have been studied in connection with coarctation of the aorta and male sensorineural hearing loss.
PCDH11Y	PCDH11X	Located in the X-transposed region (XTR) copied from Xq21.3 onto Yp11.2; one of only two protein-coding genes in the XTR. Once proposed as a third pseudoautosomal region ("PAR3") before being disproved. Encodes a human-specific cell-adhesion protein (protocadherin) that binds beta-catenin and PP1-alpha in the developing cerebral cortex.
TGIF2LY	TGIF2LX	The second X-transposed protein-coding gene on Yp11.2 (TGFB-induced factor homeobox 2-like, Y-linked).
TSPY1, TSPY2	TSPX	Testis-specific protein Y-linked on Yp11.2. T2T-Y mapped 66 total copies, including 45 protein-coding copies (44 in the AMPL2 tandem repeat array plus TSPY2), which promote the division of sperm stem cells.
AZFa	(none)	A chromosomal region rather than a single gene. First segment of the AZF (Azoospermia factor) region on the long arm (Yq11.21). Contains the four single-copy X-degenerate genes below, whose partner genes on the X chromosome escape X-inactivation.
USP9Y	USP9X	Ubiquitin specific peptidase 9 Y-linked in AZFa. A 2,555-amino-acid enzyme (C19 cysteine deubiquitinase) expressed across body tissues that removes ubiquitin tags from proteins (such as DDX3Y in lung tissue) to save them from being broken down by the proteasome.
DDX3Y	DDX3X	DEAD-box RNA helicase 3 Y-linked in AZFa. Unwinds the 5' ends of mRNAs to control protein translation, shows 2.54-fold higher ATPase enzyme activity and stronger condensation into stress granules than DDX3X, and is required for early sperm development.
UTY (KDM6C)	UTX (KDM6A)	Histone demethylase and epigenetic scaffold protein in AZFa. Gathers chromatin-remodeling complexes (SMARCA4, CHD4, COMPASS) to regulate enhancer regions on non-sex chromosomes; in mouse models, Uty suppresses acute myeloid leukemia and limits TGF-beta1 heart fibrosis and CXCL9/CXCL10 blood vessel inflammation in the lungs.
TMSB4Y	TMSB4X	Thymosin beta-4, Y-linked in AZFa. Binds G-actin building blocks to control internal cell skeleton (actin filament) assembly, cell adhesion, and the G2/M phase of cell division.
AZFb	(none)	Second AZF region on the long arm (Yq11.22). Overlaps with AZFc and is prone to accidental deletions through non-allelic homologous recombination (NAHR) with AZFc. Contains single-copy X-degenerate genes and palindromic repeat blocks.
CYorf15	CXorf15	Also called TXLNGY. A transcribed non-coding pseudogene on the Y chromosome.
RPS4Y2	RPS4X	Second Y-linked copy of ribosomal protein S4, active mainly in the testes.
EIF1AY	EIF1AX	Eukaryotic translation initiation factor 1A, Y-linked. Core part of the 43S protein-synthesis start complex; active throughout the body and expressed at fivefold higher levels than EIF1AX in human heart muscle because it lost an inhibitory miR-1 microRNA binding site.
KDM5D	KDM5C	Lysine demethylase 5D (formerly SMCY or JARID1D). A JmjC-domain histone demethylase active across body tissues that strips activating H3K4me2 and H3K4me3 chemical marks from DNA-packaging histones to turn down AMOT, matrix metalloproteinases, SLUG, and TAP1/TAP2, and binds the nuclear androgen receptor.
NLGN4Y	NLGN4X	Neuroligin 4, Y-linked on Yq11.221. A nerve-synapse adhesion protein in the central nervous system; a single amino acid difference near position 100 traps most of the protein inside the endoplasmic reticulum, preventing it from compensating for NLGN4X mutations in autism spectrum disorder.
XKRY	XK (protein)	Located in the "yellow" amplicon repeat block (8 total copies, including 2 transcribed pseudogenes in T2T-Y).
HSFY1, HSFY2	HSFX1, HSFX2	Heat shock transcription factor Y-linked, in the "blue" amplicon (8 total copies, 2 protein-coding in T2T-Y).
PRY, PRY2	(none)	Located in the "blue" amplicon (8 total copies, 2 protein-coding in T2T-Y). Related in sequence to PTPN13 on chromosome 4.
RBMY1A1	RBMX	Multi-copy gene family (34 total copies, including 6 protein-coding and 4 transcribed pseudogenes in T2T-Y). Member of the RBM gene family of RNA-splicing regulators (with an RNA recognition motif, RRM) required for sperm production.
AZFc	(none)	Third (distal) segment of the AZF region on Yq11.223–Yq11.23. Built from large DNA palindromes (P1 through P3) that frequently undergo internal gene conversion and inversions.
DAZ1, DAZ2, DAZ3, DAZ4	DAZL (Chr. 3)	Deleted in Azoospermia genes, arranged in two palindromic pairs (4 protein-coding copies in palindromes P1 and P2). Related to autosomal genes BOLL and DAZLA.
CDY1, CDY2	CDYL (Chr. 6)	Chromodomain protein, Y-linked (26 total copies, 4 protein-coding in T2T-Y: two identical CDY1 copies in palindrome P1 and two CDY2 copies in palindrome P5). Derived from a copy of autosomal CDYL and helps replace histones with protamines to tightly pack DNA in maturing sperm.
BPY2	(none)	Basic charge, Y-linked 2 (4 total copies, 3 protein-coding in T2T-Y). Binds ubiquitin protein ligase E3A (UBE3A) in male germ cells.
VCY1, VCY2	VCX	Variable charge, Y-linked (2 protein-coding copies in palindrome P8). Member of the VCX/VCY family involved in ribosome assembly in male germ cells.
PRKY	PRKX	Protein kinase, Y-linked on Yp11.2. A transcribed pseudogene and long non-coding RNA (lncRNA) related to cyclic AMP-dependent serine/threonine protein kinases, active across non-reproductive tissues and white blood cells. Lower activity of PRKY and UTY in macrophages has been observed in men carrying Y-DNA haplogroup I.
LINC00278 (YY1BM)	(none)	Long intergenic non-protein-coding RNA 278 on Yp11.2. Contains an m^{6}A-regulated coding sequence that produces a 21-amino-acid micropeptide (YY1-binding micropeptide, or YY1BM). In cell studies, YY1BM blocks the interaction between YY1 and the androgen receptor at the eEF2K gene promoter, triggering apoptosis in nutrient-starved cancer cells.
TTTY15	(none)	Testis-specific transcript, Y-linked 15 on Yq11.221. A long non-coding RNA active in multiple body tissues. In cell models, nuclear TTTY15 physically contacts chromosome 17q23 (TBX4) and binds DNMT3A to restrain lung cancer cell migration, while cytoplasmic TTTY15 sequesters microRNAs (let-7, miR-29a-3p, miR-455-5p) and can form the read-through transcript TTTY15-USP9Y.
KDM5D-AS1, ZFY-AS1	(none)	Natural antisense RNA transcripts copied from the opposite DNA strand of KDM5D and ZFY. KDM5D-AS1 pairs with KDM5D messenger RNA to stabilize it, while ZFY-AS1 sequesters miR-129-5p to regulate DDX3X and the Nrf2/HO-1 oxidative stress pathway.
PAR1 / PAR2 shared genes (SHOX, CD99, IL3RA, CSF2RA, SLC25A6, ASMT)	Identical X-PAR1 / PAR2 copies	Located in the recombining pseudoautosomal regions at the tips of the Y chromosome rather than in the MSY. These genes are expressed at higher levels from the Y chromosome in males than from the inactivated X chromosome (Xi) in females. Extra expression of SHOX from Y-PAR1 accounts for 22.6% of the average adult height difference between men and women, while loss of Y-PAR1 CD99 during mosaic loss of the Y chromosome reduces white blood cell migration.

==== Somatic expression and autosomal trans-regulation ====
For decades, the Y chromosome was widely thought to function only in the male reproductive tract. That view arose largely from software filtering in early genomic and RNA-sequencing studies. Because X-degenerate Y genes closely resemble their X-chromosome partners and ampliconic Y genes exist in nearly identical multiple copies, standard short-read RNA-sequencing pipelines (including early analyses of the Genotype-Tissue Expression [GTEx] database) automatically threw out RNA fragments that matched more than one genome location ("multimapping reads"). This filtering made it appear that only 38.8% of MSY genes were active. Similarly, a 2023 review of the NHGRI-EBI GWAS Catalog found that 97% of published genome-wide association studies excluded the Y chromosome from their results. When Alexander Godfrey, David Page, and colleagues re-examined 6,358 RNA-sequencing samples across 36 adult non-reproductive (somatic) tissues in 2020 using an expectation-maximization algorithm (kallisto) that keeps multimapping reads, they found that 80% of MSY genes and gene families (24 of 26), and 100% of those with X-chromosome counterparts, are actively transcribed at or above 1 transcript per million (TPM) across body tissues outside the testes.

To test how the Y chromosome regulates genes on the 22 non-sex chromosomes (autosomes) independently of sex hormones, researchers in 2024 measured gene expression in cells from people born with varying sex chromosome counts (1 to 3 X chromosomes and 0 to 4 Y chromosomes). In cultured lymphoblastoid blood cell lines (LCLs) and skin fibroblasts, changing the number of Y chromosomes or inactive X chromosomes (Xi) altered the activity of up to 21% of all expressed genes in the cell. Y-chromosome copy number alone changed the expression of 662 autosomal genes (6.0%) in LCLs and 226 autosomal genes (1.9%) in fibroblasts. For autosomal genes regulated by both Xi and the Y chromosome, adding an extra Y or an extra Xi shifted gene activity in the same direction and by nearly the same amount (Pearson correlation r = 0.95 in LCLs and r = 0.96 in fibroblasts). When tested directly in fresh human blood cells (primary CD4+ T cells and monocytes), sex-chromosome copy number altered 82 sex-linked genes and 344 autosomal genes. Comparing all four cell types showed that while the Y chromosome's own ubiquitous genes increase at a steady, uniform rate with each added Y chromosome in every tissue, the resulting changes on the 22 autosomes are about 2.6 times more specific to each cell type. Out of 652 autosomal genes that responded to Y-chromosome copy number across the four cell types, only 1 gene changed in all four cell types, only 6 overlapped between CD4+ T cells and monocytes, and 83% of the Y-responsive autosomal genes in skin fibroblasts did not change significantly in LCLs.

In fruit flies (Drosophila), the non-coding heterochromatin on the Y chromosome alters autosomal gene activity by soaking up chromatin-packaging proteins (a "chromatin sink"). In humans, however, comparing DYZ1 (Yq12) repeat length across 194 46,XY men and testing abnormal Y chromosomes that lacked Yq12 entirely showed that autosomal gene changes in LCLs and fibroblasts are driven by proteins encoded in the Y chromosome's euchromatic region rather than by Yq12 heterochromatin size. These cross-chromosome (trans-regulatory) effects operate through several molecular pathways:

===== Transcriptional activation by ZFY =====
Using CRISPR interference (CRISPRi) to dial down ZFY and its X-chromosome partner ZFX, researchers showed that the ZFX/ZFY transcription factor pair drives 56% of sex-chromosome-responsive autosomal gene changes in human monocytes (P = 0.01), 59% in CD4+ T cells (P = 1.56 × 10^{−6}), and 46% to 57% of co-regulated autosomal genes in fibroblasts.

===== Chromatin remodeling and histone demethylation by UTY and KDM5D =====
The Y-linked protein UTY (KDM6C) has lower enzyme activity for removing repressive H3K27me3 histone marks than its X-linked counterpart UTX (KDM6A), but it acts as a structural scaffold on chromatin. By forming droplet-like protein condensates (phase separation) and binding ATP-dependent chromatin remodelers such as SMARCA4 (BRG1), CHD4, and the COMPASS complex, UTY opens or closes H3K27ac and H3K4me1 enhancer regions across the autosomes. At the same time, the enzyme KDM5D is expressed across body tissues at levels similar to KDM5C. KDM5D strips activating H3K4me2 and H3K4me3 marks from gene promoters to turn down cell-to-cell adhesion genes (AMOT), tissue-remodeling matrix metalloproteinases (MMPs), epithelial-to-mesenchymal transition (EMT) regulators (SLUG, CUL4A), and MHC class I immune antigen-presentation genes (TAP1 and TAP2), while also binding the androgen receptor inside the cell nucleus.

===== Phase separation, protein synthesis, and stability =====
Although DDX3Y protein was once thought to exist only in the testes, ribosome profiling and antibody tests showed that DDX3Y is transcribed throughout body tissues (at 30% to 50% of DDX3X levels) and that cells stabilize DDX3Y protein whenever DDX3X levels drop. Because of amino acid differences in its flexible N-terminal region (intrinsically disordered region 1, or IDR1), the RNA helicase DDX3Y has a 2.54-fold higher ATPase enzyme rate than DDX3X (7.9 versus 3.1 mM/min) and condenses more readily into liquid-like protein droplets (liquid-liquid phase separation, or LLPS). In laser-bleaching (FRAP) experiments, DDX3Y droplets took 83.4 seconds to recover half their fluorescence with a 78% mobile fraction, compared to 21.9 seconds and a 99% mobile fraction for DDX3X. As a result, DDX3Y represses mRNA translation more strongly and promotes greater clumping of FUS protein inside cellular stress granules.

In human lung tissue, the 2,555-amino-acid Y-linked enzyme USP9Y clips ubiquitin chains off DDX3Y to keep it from being degraded by the proteasome. In the human heart, EIF1AY lost an inhibitory binding site for the microRNA miR-1; freed from miR-1 repression, EIF1AY is expressed at five times the level of EIF1AX, nearly doubling the total pool of EIF1A translation-initiation protein in male heart muscle compared to female heart muscle. During heart muscle differentiation, TBL1Y helps release the Notch corepressor CtBP to support cardiomyocyte development and contraction (and TBL1Y variants have been investigated in coarctation of the aorta and male hearing loss), while the ribosomal subunit RPS4Y1 influences STAT3 phosphorylation in cultured placental trophoblasts (studied in pre-eclampsia) and p38 MAPK phosphorylation in high-glucose blood vessel endothelial cells.

The ribosomal protein gene RPS4Y1 is active in non-reproductive tissues throughout the male body (while RPS4Y2 is active in the testes and prostate) and encodes a protein that differs by 19 amino acids from its X-chromosome counterpart RPS4X. Male body cells incorporate Y-encoded RPS4Y1 directly into the 40S small subunit of their ribosomes. During male pregnancies, the placenta develops from fetal tissue and carries a 46,XY chromosome set; from the first trimester onward, before the fetal testes begin producing sex hormones, X-degenerate Y genes (DDX3Y, UTY, KDM5D, ZFY, EIF1AY, RPS4Y1, and USP9Y) and PCDH11Y are transcribed in outer placental cells (trophoblasts) and placental blood vessels, contributing to early sex differences in placental gene expression. In preclinical prostate cell models and tumor samples, KDM5D binds the nuclear androgen receptor (AR) to restrain AR-driven transcription and removes activating H3K4me3 methyl tags from the promoters of tissue-invasion genes (MMP1, MMP2, MMP3, MMP7, and SLUG) and cell-division genes (E2F1 and CUL4A); loss or reduced expression of KDM5D in these models is associated with increased tumor invasiveness and reduced sensitivity to docetaxel.

The ribosomal protein gene RPS4Y1 is active in non-reproductive tissues throughout the male body (while RPS4Y2 is active in the testes and prostate) and encodes a protein that differs by 19 amino acids from its X-chromosome counterpart RPS4X. Male body cells build Y-encoded RPS4Y1 directly into the 40S small subunit of their ribosomes, so that male organs assemble protein-making machinery with a distinct male-specific subunit. During male pregnancies, the placenta develops from fetal tissue and therefore carries a 46,XY chromosome set. From the first trimester onward, before the fetal testes begin producing sex hormones, X-degenerate Y genes (DDX3Y, UTY, KDM5D, ZFY, EIF1AY, RPS4Y1, and USP9Y) and PCDH11Y are actively transcribed in outer placental cells (trophoblasts) and placental blood vessels. Their activity contributes to early male-female differences in placental gene regulation, immune signaling, and fetal growth rates. In laboratory studies of prostate lining cells, the Y-encoded enzyme KDM5D binds the nuclear androgen receptor (AR) to restrain AR-driven gene activation and removes activating H3K4me3 methyl tags from the start sites (promoters) of tissue-invasion genes (MMP1, MMP2, MMP3, MMP7, and SLUG) and cell-division genes (E2F1 and CUL4A). In cell models and tumor samples, deletion or downregulation of KDM5D is associated with more invasive prostate tumor growth and reduced sensitivity to docetaxel.

===== Non-coding RNAs, antisense transcripts, and micropeptides =====
Among the 587 non-coding genes on T2T-Y, LINC00278 (on Yp11.2) codes for a 21-amino-acid micropeptide called YY1BM (YY1-binding micropeptide), which is translated only when the RNA carries an m^{6}A methylation mark recognized by YTHDF1. In laboratory studies of esophageal squamous cell carcinoma cells, YY1BM blocks the transcription factor YY1 from partnering with the androgen receptor at the promoter of eEF2K, which keeps protein elongation running and triggers programmed cell death (apoptosis) under nutrient starvation. Exposure to cigarette smoke increases levels of the m^{6}A-erasing enzyme ALKBH5, which strips the m^{6}A mark from LINC00278, lowers YY1BM production, and supports tumor cell survival in experimental models.

Another Y-linked long non-coding RNA, TTTY15, performs different roles depending on where it sits in the cell. Inside the nucleus of non-small cell lung cancer cell lines, 3D chromosome-contact mapping (4C-seq) showed that the TTTY15 region physically touches chromosome 17q23 near TBX4, where TTTY15 RNA binds the DNA methyltransferase DNMT3A to inhibit promoter methylation and reduce cell migration. Outside the nucleus, in the cytoplasm of prostate cancer, gastric cancer, and oxygen-starved heart muscle cells, TTTY15 acts as a molecular decoy ("competing endogenous RNA" or ceRNA sponge) that binds microRNAs let-7, miR-29a-3p, and miR-455-5p to control WNT1, DVL3, CDK6, FN1, and JDP2. Continuous read-through transcription across neighboring genes also produces a fused RNA, TTTY15-USP9Y, which has been studied as a candidate biomarker in prostate cancer. Two antisense RNAs transcribed from the opposite DNA strand of Y genes also regulate cell pathways: KDM5D-AS1 binds and stabilizes KDM5D mRNA, while ZFY-AS1 sequesters miR-129-5p to influence DDX3X and the Nrf2/HO-1 antioxidant response.

===== Nuclear 3D organization, DNA methylation, and paternal effects on daughters =====
Three-dimensional chromosome mapping (Hi-C) shows that the Y chromosome's repetitive DNA blocks in Yq12 and around its centromere sit against the inner rim of the cell nucleus (the nuclear lamina) and the nucleolus, where they make frequent physical contact with other chromosomes.

In mammals, chromosome-substitution (consomic) experiments in mice have shown that a father's Y chromosome can shape physical and behavioral traits in his daughters even though daughters never inherit the Y chromosome. When researchers bred genetically identical 46,XX female mice whose fathers differed only in which mouse strain's Y chromosome they carried, 46.5% of 41 measured metabolic, immune, and behavioral traits differed significantly among the daughters depending on their father's Y chromosome. Two epigenetic processes during sperm production (spermatogenesis) and maturation pass these Y-chromosome effects onto the autosomes and X chromosome that a father transmits to his offspring. First, as sperm DNA is packed for transport, most of the spool-like histone proteins (nucleosomes) around which DNA is wrapped are replaced by smaller, tightly packing protamine proteins, leaving only 1% to 10% of histones attached to the sperm's DNA. Y-linked chromatin regulators, including chromodomain proteins such as CDY, help determine where those remaining histones stay attached along the chromosomes passed to the embryo. Second, as maturing sperm travel through the epididymis, small membrane-bound sacs (epididymosomes) load paternal small non-coding RNAs, particularly tRNA-derived small RNAs (tsRNAs) and microRNAs, into the sperm. After fertilization, these paternal RNAs regulate gene activity and mobile genetic elements (retroelements) in the early preimplantation embryo.

In the fruit fly Drosophila melanogaster, the Y chromosome is 40 Mbp long and consists mostly of tightly packed, non-coding DNA (heterochromatin). Although it makes up roughly 20% of the male genome and carries only 13 protein-coding genes, natural variants of the Y chromosome from different paternal lines alter the activity of more than 1,000 genes on the autosomes. This effect also appears in fertile XXY female flies, even though their Y-linked protein-coding genes are inactive. In comparisons of XXY and XX females that otherwise shared the exact same autosomal, X-chromosomal, and mitochondrial DNA, the presence of a Y chromosome changed the expression of 383 genes in the ovaries (with over 80% turned down) and reduced the expression of all 33 mitochondrial genes (P < 0.001), even though both groups carried the same number of mitochondrial DNA copies. In the larval central nervous system, the Y chromosome altered the activity of 321 genes: it turned down 69 of 93 presynaptic genes (P < 0.001), 38 of 47 postsynaptic genes (P < 0.001), and 6 of 12 dopamine pathway genes. Separate comparisons of sex-chromosome combinations in Drosophila melanogaster found that XXY females carrying a paternally inherited Y chromosome had a 9% higher dry body mass (P = 9.463 × 10^{−3}) and laid 57% to 63% more eggs, whereas XYY male offspring had lower survival rates. Genome-wide protein-binding maps (ChIP-seq) across X0, XY, XYY, and XXY flies showed how the Y chromosome produces these effects. The cell nucleus holds a limited supply of proteins that pack DNA into silent heterochromatin, including HP1a, the histone methyltransferase enzyme Su(var)3-9, sirtuins, and the histone chaperones ATRX, DAXX, and HIRA. Because the Y chromosome contains large stretches of repetitive DNA, it acts as a "chromatin sink" that soaks up these silencing proteins. This pulls the proteins away from the centromere-adjacent regions (pericentromeres) of other chromosomes and redistributes repressive histone marks (H3K9me2 and H3K9me3) across the rest of the genome.

=== Y-chromosome-linked diseases ===
Diseases and clinical conditions linked to the Y chromosome stem from several mechanisms: the gradual loss of the Y chromosome in body cells during aging (mosaic loss), small deletions in fertility-related regions (microdeletions), mutations or structural defects in SRY and X-degenerate genes, aneuploidy (an abnormal number of sex chromosomes), and regulatory differences among Y-chromosome lineages.

==== Loss of Y chromosome ====
As men age, some of their dividing non-reproductive body cells (somatic cells) can lose the Y chromosome during cell division (mitosis), a condition called mosaic loss of the Y chromosome (mLOY). This is the most common acquired genetic mutation in human males and occurs more than 1,000 times as frequently as mosaic losses or gains of non-sex chromosomes. The frequency of mLOY increases sharply with age, and smoking is a major environmental risk factor. In a genome-wide association study of 205,011 men in the UK Biobank (replicated in 653,019 men from 23andMe and 95,380 men from BioBank Japan), detectable mLOY in white blood cells (leukocytes) was found in 20.0% of men overall. Its prevalence rose from 2.5% at age 40 to 43.6% at age 70, and reached 57.0% by age 93 in long-term follow-up studies. Risk is also associated with radiotherapy and with 156 inherited genetic variants on the autosomes and X chromosome that control chromosome separation during cell division, DNA damage detection, and programmed cell death (apoptosis), including TCL1A, BCL2, CHEK2, TP53INP1, and CCND2. These same genetic variants overlap with inherited susceptibility to solid tumors and Type 2 diabetes. Single-cell RNA and surface-protein profiling (CITE-seq) of human white blood cells showed that losing the Y chromosome alters the expression of roughly 500 autosomal genes (a pattern termed LOY-Associated Transcriptional Effects, or LATE, with 465 genes disrupted in regulatory T cells). It also reduces cell-surface levels of the PAR1-encoded immune protein CD99, which white blood cells need to pass through blood vessel walls into tissues (transendothelial migration).

Reviews of population cohorts note that men with a higher proportion of blood-forming (hematopoietic) cells lacking the Y chromosome have an elevated risk of several cancers, cardiovascular disease, and shorter life expectancy, demonstrating that the Y chromosome has physiological functions beyond sex determination. Earlier reviews noted that it was initially uncertain whether mLOY directly contributed to pathology or was simply a neutral marker of aging and genomic instability. Secondary medical reviews and experimental mouse and human cellular studies published between 2022 and 2026 have examined mechanisms linking Y-chromosome loss in blood and tumor cells to organ fibrosis (scarring), heart failure, tumor immune evasion, and kidney injury.

In cardiovascular cohorts, UK Biobank data over a median follow-up of 11.5 years showed that men with Y-chromosome loss in more than 40% of their white blood cells had a 31% higher risk of cardiovascular mortality (multivariable-adjusted hazard ratio [HR] = 1.0054 per 1% mLOY increase, P = 0.0010). Observational studies of men undergoing transcatheter aortic valve replacement (TAVR, n = 362) or coronary angiography (n = 3,066) likewise reported that Y-chromosome loss above 17% in monocytes or whole blood was associated with higher 3-year mortality after TAVR (HR = 2.01, P = 0.001), higher all-cause mortality (HR = 1.41), higher cardiovascular mortality (HR = 1.49), and higher fatal myocardial infarction risk (HR = 2.65, P = 0.002). Combined DNA-methylation and single-cell RNA analyses in the coronary angiography cohort linked Y-chromosome loss in human blood cells to heavy methylation and silencing of the autosomal ribosomal protein S5 gene (RPS5) in macrophages, associated with release of a scar-promoting (profibrotic) secretome that stimulates neighboring heart fibroblasts to deposit collagen. In mouse experiments using CRISPR-Cas9 to remove the Y chromosome from blood stem cells, Soichi Sano, Kenneth Walsh, and colleagues found that mice lacking the Y chromosome in their blood cells developed spontaneous scarring (fibrosis) in the heart, lungs, and kidneys, impaired heart relaxation (diastolic dysfunction), working-memory deficits, and earlier death. In March 2024, Keita Horitani, Walsh, and colleagues showed that deleting just one Y-chromosome epigenetic regulator gene, Uty (Kdm6c), in mouse blood cells reproduced the fibrotic effects of losing the entire Y chromosome. Without Uty, circulating monocytes underwent chromatin changes and differentiated into profibrotic Lyve1+ macrophages upon entering the heart, overproducing transforming growth factor beta 1 (TGF-beta1) and galectin-3 and activating pSMAD2+ cardiac fibroblasts to scar the heart muscle. In mouse models of pulmonary arterial hypertension (PAH), an intact Uty gene in lung macrophages plays a protective role by suppressing the inflammatory chemokines CXCL9 and CXCL10, preventing CXCR3-triggered cell death in the lining of the pulmonary arteries.

In cancer biology, somatic loss of the Y chromosome occurs in 10% to 50% of male solid tumors, including bladder, kidney, lung, esophageal, and pancreatic cancers. In experimental bladder cancer models, tumors lacking the Y chromosome grew at the same speed as Y-positive tumors in laboratory dishes (in vitro) and in mice lacking T cells, but grew much more aggressively in mice with an intact immune system. Loss of the Y chromosome, particularly its chromatin-modifying genes KDM5D and UTY, increased the number of immune-suppressing PD-L1+ macrophages and pushed tumor-infiltrating CD8+ and CD4+ T cells into TOX-driven terminal exhaustion (a state in which T cells can no longer attack tumor cells). A June 2025 analysis across 29 human cancer types found that when tumor cells lose the Y chromosome, the CD4+ and CD8+ T cells infiltrating those tumors are also much more likely to have lost their Y chromosome, a dual loss associated with immunosuppressive T-cell states and poorer patient survival.

In blood cancers, Uty suppresses acute myeloid leukemia (AML) in Utx-deficient mice by repressing cancer-promoting ETS/PU.1 gene programs and maintaining chromatin accessibility at GATA2. Conversely, other tumors retain the Y chromosome and co-opt individual Y-linked genes: in KRAS-mutant male colorectal cancer models, phosphorylated ERK activates STAT4 to turn up KDM5D, which strips H3K4me2/3 methylation marks at the AMOT tight-junction promoter (promoting liver metastasis) and at the TAP1/TAP2 antigen-presentation promoters (reducing recognition by CD8+ T cells). Similarly, in MYC-driven Burkitt lymphoma and diffuse large B-cell lymphoma, tumor cells acquire mutations in X-linked DDX3X to survive protein-production stress and later upregulate Y-linked DDX3Y to restore full protein synthesis.

Observational and experimental studies have also examined blood and tissue mLOY in several non-cancer conditions. Single-cell profiling of 23,333 cell nuclei from adult male kidney cortex found Y-chromosome loss in 11% to 15% of cortical cells, concentrated in oxygen-starved (hypoxia-injured) VCAM1+/HAVCR1+ proximal tubule cells with NF-κB-driven inflammatory chromatin activity. In mouse and human kidney-injury studies, hematopoietic Y-chromosome loss increased inhibitory immune-checkpoint receptors (PD-1, TIGIT, and LAG3) on infiltrating immune cells, reducing their clearance of aged, non-dividing (senescent) cells and accelerating renal scarring. Clinical cohorts have further reported associations between blood mLOY and severe COVID-19 in male intensive-care patients (accompanied by reduced CD99 levels), higher mortality in wild-type transthyretin cardiac amyloidosis, male susceptibility and profibrotic signaling in idiopathic pulmonary fibrosis (IPF), and faster epigenetic aging, airflow obstruction, and emphysema. In a Danish study of 917 men aged 56 to 100 years (estimating 72% broad-sense heritability for mLOY in twins), mLOY was associated with higher mortality in men under 80 and plateaued near 40% prevalence after age 85, whereas among centenarians over 100 years old it showed an inverse association with mortality (HR = 0.50, P = 0.044), attributed to survivor selection.

Epidemiological studies indicate that smoking-associated mLOY in human blood is dose-dependent and declines after smoking cessation. In preclinical mouse models, treating mLOY mice with a TGF-beta1 neutralizing antibody reversed cardiac fibrosis and restored heart function, and Y-deficient bladder tumors showed increased sensitivity to anti-PD-1/PD-L1 immune checkpoint inhibitor therapy in experimental and retrospective clinical datasets, though targeted clinical interventions for mLOY remain under investigation.

Natural variation between intact Y chromosomes has also been examined in consomic rodent models (inbred strains in which the Y chromosome of one strain is bred onto the identical autosomal, X-chromosomal, and mitochondrial background of another strain) and in human Y-DNA haplogroup studies. In rats (comparing SHRSP and WKY strains), swapping only the Y chromosome shifts systolic blood pressure by 15 to 20 mm Hg and causes salt-sensitive hypertension. In rodent models, the specific Y chromosome carried also regulates blood levels of IGF-I, alters the weight of the heart, kidneys, and adrenal glands, modifies aggression and anxiety behaviors, and acts as a genome-wide regulatory locus (trans-eQTL) that changes the expression of hundreds of autosomal immune genes in CD4+ T cells and macrophages, influencing susceptibility to paralysis in experimental autoimmune encephalomyelitis (a mouse model of multiple sclerosis). In October 2024, researchers discovered a previously unrecognized 3.22 Mbp X-to-Y chromosomal translocation on the Y^{Sry−} chromosome of the widely used C57BL/6J "Four Core Genotypes" (FCG) mouse strain (Jackson Strain 010905), which duplicated nine X-linked genes including Tlr7 and Tlr8. This finding showed that sex-chromosome effects in mouse models must be verified using pure consomic Y-chromosome swaps, translocation-free FCG lines (Strain 039108), or single-gene knockouts. In a 2012 study of more than 3,200 White British men, carrying Y-DNA haplogroup I was associated with an approximately 50% higher age-adjusted risk of coronary artery disease (odds ratio [OR] = 1.56, P = 0.0002) regardless of traditional cardiovascular risk factors, accompanied by lower expression of UTY and PRKY in macrophages and altered activity across 19 autosomal inflammatory and vascular pathways, though subsequent UK Biobank analyses concluded that residual geographic ancestry differences (population stratification) and lifestyle factors explain much of the apparent association between haplogroup I1 and coronary artery disease.

==== Y chromosome microdeletion ====
Y chromosome microdeletion (YCM) is a group of genetic disorders caused by missing genes in the AZFa, AZFb, or AZFc regions of the Y chromosome. Most affected men have no general health symptoms and lead normal lives, yet YCM is the most common known genetic cause of severe male infertility. Microdeletions occur in about 1 in 4,000 men in the general population, 10% to 15% of men who produce no sperm in their semen without a physical blockage (non-obstructive azoospermia), and 5% to 10% of men with very low sperm counts (severe oligozoospermia). Most microdeletions arise as new (de novo) events in the father's sperm-producing cells when the Y chromosome misaligns and recombines between nearly identical palindrome arms or viral repeat sequences (non-allelic homologous recombination, or NAHR). How severely a microdeletion affects fertility depends on which of the three Azoospermia Factor (AZF) subregions on the long arm (Yq11) is lost:

- Deletions of the AZFa region (spanning about 792 kbp on proximal Yq11.21, caused by misalignment between two human endogenous retrovirus HERV15 repeat blocks) remove the single-copy genes USP9Y and DDX3Y. Complete AZFa deletions cause Sertoli cell-only syndrome (SCOS), a condition in which the sperm-producing tubes of the testes (seminiferous tubules) contain supporting Sertoli cells but no sperm-forming germ cells at all. Experiments using human induced pluripotent stem cells with AZFa deletions showed that the loss of DDX3Y (which is needed for early sperm-forming stem cells, or pre-meiotic spermatogonia, to survive and divide) is the main cause of AZFa infertility; putting a working copy of DDX3Y back into these cells restores germ-cell development and gene expression.
- Deletions of the AZFb region (spanning about 6.2 Mbp from palindrome P5 to the start of palindrome P1 on Yq11.22, or about 7.7 Mbp in combined AZFb+c deletions) remove several single-copy and multi-copy genes, including RBMY1, HSFY, PRY, EIF1AY, KDM5D, and RPS4Y2. Complete AZFb deletions halt sperm development during meiosis at the primary spermatocyte stage, because RBMY1 and HSFY are required for testis-specific RNA splicing and meiotic cell division.
- Deletions of the AZFc region (spanning about 3.5 Mbp across palindromes P1 through P3 on distal Yq11.223–Yq11.23, caused by misalignment between the 229 kbp b2 and b4 amplicons) make up 60% to 80% of all clinically diagnosed Y-chromosome microdeletions. Full AZFc deletions remove all four copies of the RNA-translation regulator DAZ (DAZ1 through DAZ4), two of the four coding copies of CDY1 (which encodes an enzyme that adds acetyl groups to histone H4 so that standard DNA-packaging histones can be swapped out for compact protamine proteins as the sperm head condenses), and all three coding copies of BPY2. Men with complete AZFc deletions range from having no sperm in their semen (azoospermia) to having very low sperm counts (severe oligozoospermia). Smaller partial AZFc deletions, particularly the ~1.6 Mbp gr/gr deletion that removes half of the AZFc gene copies, raise the risk of low sperm counts in several European and Asian paternal lineages. In contrast, the gr/gr deletion is present in 100% of men belonging to Y-DNA haplogroups D2 (common in Japan and Tibet) and N (common across northern Eurasia) without impairing fertility, because later amplicon duplications and structural rearrangements in those lineages restored adequate sperm production.

==== Defective Y chromosome ====
A defective Y chromosome can cause a person with an XY karyotype to develop a female phenotype, as seen in 46,XY complete gonadal dysgenesis (Swyer syndrome). This leads to infertility and incomplete sexual development.

An incomplete Y chromosome, such as a 45,X karyotype combined with a Y-chromosome fragment, can cause incomplete genital development in which internal or external gonads do not fully form. A wide range of physical outcomes can occur, particularly when mosaicism (such as 45,X/46,XY, where different cells in the body carry different chromosome sets) is present. When the Y fragment is very small and nonfunctional, the person may develop externally as female with traits of Turner syndrome or mixed gonadal dysgenesis.

==== Sex determination cascade and the Swyer versus CAIS clinical distinction ====
Until about seven weeks of human embryonic gestation, the early gonad is bipotential (capable of becoming either an ovary or a testis) and develops along the female ovarian pathway by default unless redirected by the Y-linked gene SRY. The SRY protein functions as an architectural transcription factor, meaning that it activates target genes by physically reshaping DNA. Through its 79-amino-acid High-Mobility Group (HMG) box domain, SRY recognizes a specific target sequence (A/TAACAAT/A) within the narrower minor groove of double-stranded DNA. When SRY binds to this site, it wedges amino acid side chains into the minor groove and bends the DNA double helix by 60 to 85 degrees. This sharp bend creates the three-dimensional shape needed for regulatory proteins to assemble at the testis-specific enhancer of the gene SOX9 and switch it on.

Once turned on by this brief embryonic pulse of SRY, the SOX9 protein binds to its own enhancers in a self-sustaining positive feedback loop. This keeps SOX9 active even after SRY expression stops and directs precursor support cells in the gonad to mature into testicular Sertoli cells. Sertoli cells form the seminiferous tubules and secrete anti-Müllerian hormone (AMH), which causes the Müllerian ducts (the embryonic structures that would otherwise form the uterus and fallopian tubes) to shrink and disappear. At the same time, testicular Leydig cells produce testosterone to drive the masculinization of internal and external reproductive tissues.

This two-step process separates Y-chromosomal sex determination (forming testes via SRY) from hormone-driven sex differentiation (masculinizing the body via androgens). The difference between the two steps can be seen by comparing two 46,XY conditions that both result in an external female appearance:

- In Swyer syndrome (46,XY complete gonadal dysgenesis, usually caused by point mutations in the SRY HMG-box that prevent the protein from entering the cell nucleus or properly binding and bending DNA), the initial sex-determination switch fails. Because functional testes and Sertoli cells never form, the gonads produce neither testosterone nor AMH. Without AMH to clear them away, the embryonic Müllerian ducts remain and develop into a uterus and fallopian tubes. Rare cases of paternal mosaicism also illustrate how sensitive the SRY–SOX9 switch is to gene dosage: a father who carries an SRY mutation in only a fraction of his cells can still develop normal testes if enough healthy SRY is present in his gonads, yet pass the mutated SRY to every cell of his 46,XY daughter, who then develops Swyer syndrome.
- In complete androgen insensitivity syndrome (CAIS, caused by loss-of-function mutations in the X-linked androgen receptor gene AR), the Y-linked SRY gene works normally. Testes form in the abdomen and secrete both testosterone and AMH. Because the body's cells lack working androgen receptors, peripheral tissues cannot respond to testosterone and develop externally along the female pathway; however, because AMH signaling still works normally, the Müllerian ducts regress in the embryo, and the person is born without a uterus or fallopian tubes.

Beyond SRY, other Y-chromosome genes are required later in life for sperm production. In January 2025, researchers at the Francis Crick Institute used CRISPR-Cas9 in mice to disable 13 Y-chromosome genes one by one and in combination. Three individual genes proved essential for normal spermatogenesis: Eif2s3y, Uty (which regulates the multiplication of sperm-precursor spermatogonial cells), and Zfy2 (which helps the X and Y chromosomes pair properly during meiosis). Disabling any of the other single Y genes did not visibly deform the sperm, but still altered gene-expression patterns (the transcriptome) in the non-germ support cells of the testis. In addition, deleting multiple Y genes at once to mimic human AZFa infertility deletions caused severe reproductive defects that did not appear when those same genes were knocked out individually.

==== XXY ====
Klinefelter syndrome (47,XXY) is caused by an extra X chromosome in a male rather than a structural defect or aneuploidy of the Y chromosome itself, and it typically impairs testicular function after birth. This impairment occurs because genes on the extra X chromosome that normally escape X-inactivation, together with pseudoautosomal genes shared between the X and Y chromosomes, are expressed at higher doses, rather than because the extra X chromosome silences Y-linked genes.

==== XYY ====
47,XYY syndrome (commonly called XYY syndrome) occurs when a male has an extra copy of the Y chromosome in each cell, giving one X chromosome and two Y chromosomes (47 chromosomes in total). Having an extra Y chromosome is linked to taller average height (driven in part by an extra active copy of the SHOX growth gene in the PAR1 region) and a higher rate of learning difficulties in some boys and men. However, the physical and cognitive effects vary widely and are often minimal, and most men with a 47,XYY karyotype never learn that they have it.

In 1965 and 1966, Patricia Jacobs and colleagues surveyed the chromosomes of 315 male patients at Scotland's only special security hospital for the developmentally disabled and found a higher-than-expected number of men with an extra Y chromosome. The authors asked "whether an extra Y chromosome predisposes its carriers to unusually aggressive behaviour", a question that shaped the next fifteen years of human Y-chromosome research.

Follow-up studies over the next decade disproved this hypothesis. They showed that the slightly elevated conviction rate among XYY males was explained by lower median intelligence rather than increased aggression, and that increased height was the only physical trait reliably linked to the karyotype. As a result, the idea of a "criminal karyotype" was abandoned as inaccurate.

Males can also carry rarer higher-order X-chromosome aneuploidies, including XXXY syndrome (48,XXXY) and XXXXY syndrome (49,XXXXY).

==== Rare ====
Several rarer Y-chromosome conditions have helped clarify how specific regions of the Y chromosome function.

===== More than two Y chromosomes =====
Higher degrees of Y-chromosome polysomy (having more than one extra Y chromosome in every cell, such as 48,XYYY) are much rarer than 47,XYY. The additional genetic material in these conditions can be associated with skeletal and dental differences, lower IQ, delayed development, and respiratory problems, though severity varies widely among individuals.

===== XX male syndrome =====
XX male syndrome occurs when accidental genetic recombination during the formation of male gametes (sperm) transfers the SRY-containing piece of the Y chromosome onto an X chromosome. When a sperm carrying that X chromosome fertilizes an egg, the presence of SRY triggers the development of male testes even though the embryo has an XX karyotype.

=== Genetic genealogy ===
In human genetic genealogy (the use of DNA testing alongside traditional genealogy), the Y chromosome is especially useful because, unlike other chromosomes, it is passed down almost unchanged from father to son along the direct paternal (patrilineal) line. Mitochondrial DNA, which mothers pass to both sons and daughters, is used in a similar way to trace the direct maternal (matrilineal) line.

In population genetics, this unshuffled inheritance of the male-specific Y chromosome (MSY) differs sharply from the inheritance of non-sex chromosomes (autosomes). Because meiotic recombination breaks up and reshuffles autosomal chromosomes in every generation, two randomly chosen individuals from a large population (such as Europeans) share an average total of only 1.85 centimorgans (about 1.85 megabase pairs, or 0.06% of the 3,100 Mbp haploid autosomal genome) in verified identical-by-descent (IBD) DNA segments inherited from common ancestors. Standard autosomal methods such as principal component analysis (PCA) compare broad, population-wide averages in allele frequencies (known as identity by state). By contrast, two men who share a Y-chromosome haplogroup have inherited the entire non-recombining ~57 to 62.46 Mbp MSY region identical by descent from a single common patrilineal founder. This forms a single unbroken IBD segment more than 30 times larger than the average total autosomal IBD DNA shared between two random people from the same population. Across the global human Y-chromosome family tree, researchers have cataloged more than 140,000 branch-defining SNPs to trace patrilineal migrations, population bottlenecks, and male-line kinship across 182,900 years of modern human history.

=== Brain function ===
Researchers have long examined whether sex differences in brain development and neurological disease risk come directly from Y-chromosome genes active inside brain cells or indirectly from androgenic hormones produced by the testes. Molecular, cellular, and animal studies indicate that several Y-chromosome genes act directly inside brain cells to affect synapse formation, neurotransmitter production, cerebral cortex development, and brain inflammation, independently of circulating sex hormones.

Autism spectrum disorder (ASD) is diagnosed about four times more often in males than in females, and males with a 47,XYY karyotype have higher rates of ASD symptoms. In 2020, Thien Nguyen, Katherine Roche, and colleagues studied the synaptic cell-adhesion genes NLGN4X (on the X chromosome) and NLGN4Y (on the Y chromosome), which help connect neurons at synapses. Although the NLGN4X and NLGN4Y proteins share about 97% of their amino acid sequence, they do not perform the same job in human neurons. X-linked NLGN4X matures normally, travels to the receiving (postsynaptic) surface of the neuron, and promotes the formation of excitatory synapses. By contrast, Y-linked NLGN4Y gets trapped inside the endoplasmic reticulum (ER, the cell's internal protein-processing compartment), fails to reach the cell surface, and cannot build excitatory synapses. The researchers traced this block to a single amino acid difference between NLGN4Y and NLGN4X near position 100 in the protein's outer esterase-homology domain. In NLGN4X, a cluster of disease-associated missense mutations found in people with ASD and intellectual disability (p.G84R, p.R87W, p.P94L, p.G99S, and p.R101Q) sits right around this same site. These NLGN4X mutations mimic normal NLGN4Y by preventing the protein from maturing, trapping it in the ER, and reducing both the frequency and strength of miniature excitatory postsynaptic currents (mEPSCs). Because 46,XX females have two working copies of NLGN4X whereas 46,XY males have only one copy paired with ER-trapped NLGN4Y, males lack a functional backup if their single copy of NLGN4X is mutated.

A second direct brain pathway involves Parkinson's disease (PD), which affects men 1.5 to 2 times as often as women and typically begins earlier with faster motor decline. In the adult human male brain, the sex-determining protein SRY is continuously produced inside the nucleus and cytoplasm of tyrosine hydroxylase-positive (TH+) dopaminergic neurons in the substantia nigra pars compacta (SNc) and ventral tegmental area (VTA), midbrain regions that control movement. In healthy male neurons, SRY binds directly to the promoter regions of genes that manufacture and regulate dopamine, including TH (the rate-limiting enzyme in dopamine synthesis), DDC, DBH, and DRD2, helping regulate nigrostriatal dopamine levels and voluntary movement without relying on gonadal hormones. In human male neural cells, SRY also creates a direct Y-to-X regulatory link by binding the core promoter of the X-linked gene MAOA (which encodes an enzyme that breaks down dopamine and serotonin) and partnering with the transcription factor Sp1 to boost MAOA transcription; knocking down SRY reduces intracellular MAOA enzyme activity by 45%. In experimental rat models of Parkinson's disease triggered by oxidative toxins (6-OHDA or rotenone), DNA damage switches on the cellular stress sensor GADD45G. This activates the p38-MAPK signaling pathway and causes Sry expression in the male substantia nigra to surge up to ninefold. Although a brief rise in SRY helps protect neurons during short-term stress, prolonged SRY overproduction in damaged dopamine neurons speeds up toxic dopamine breakdown (auto-oxidation) and MAO-driven hydrogen peroxide production. This further damages mitochondria and DNA and increases brain inflammation (raising levels of TNF-alpha, IL-1beta, and iNOS), accelerating dopamine neuron loss. Infusing Sry-blocking antisense oligonucleotides (ASOs) into the substantia nigra of male rats prevented excess Sry production, reduced neuroinflammation, and protected dopamine neurons in the animal model, while having no effect in female rats.

Age-related mosaic loss of the Y chromosome (mLOY) has also been studied in brain immune cells. Epidemiological cohorts first linked mLOY in blood cells to a higher risk of Alzheimer's disease (AD) in older men. In October 2022, single-nucleus RNA-seq and ATAC-seq analysis of 94 aged postmortem human brains showed that while non-dividing (post-mitotic) brain cells such as neurons, astrocytes, and oligodendrocytes rarely lose their Y chromosome, dividing brain immune cells called microglia frequently do. In male AD brain samples, 28.1% of microglia lacked a Y chromosome compared to 2.51% in age-matched controls (P < 0.001), reaching 32.7% versus 3.27% in the entorhinal cortex and 21.0% versus 1.81% in the somatosensory cortex. Microglia lacking a Y chromosome also lost expression of KDM5D and UTY and shifted toward a pro-inflammatory transcriptional state. Whole-exome sequencing of sorted immune cells from AD patients with Y-chromosome loss further identified a 4.8-fold enrichment (OR = 4.8, P = 0.041) of non-canonical clonal hematopoiesis driver mutations in myeloid immune cells, correlated with the share of myeloid cells missing a Y chromosome (r = 0.52, P = 0.00041). Similarly, a 2025 study of more than 1.3 million brain cells from 279 postmortem samples and observational cohorts reported associations between mLOY and higher Parkinson's disease risk (HR = 1.16, P = 0.04), faster motor decline (P = 0.0072), faster cognitive decline (P = 0.0005), reduced functional connectivity in frontal control and salience brain networks, and elevated Y loss in microglia and brain blood-vessel cells showing HIF-1 stress-pathway and apoptotic gene activity.

Other Y-linked genes help shape early development of the cerebral cortex. The human-specific X-transposed gene PCDH11Y encodes a cell-surface protocadherin protein strongly expressed in the fetal and newborn cerebral cortex, where it interacts with beta-catenin and protein phosphatase 1-alpha (PP1-alpha) to guide the growth of nerve fibers (axons) and wire neural circuits. In addition, ribosome-profiling experiments have shown that the Y-linked protein DDX3Y and its X-linked counterpart DDX3X perform nearly the same biochemical function in translating mRNA into protein (rescuing 94% versus 99% of DDX3X-dependent transcripts). However, because DDX3Y is expressed at lower levels than DDX3X in parts of the developing cerebral cortex, this regional dosage difference influences sex-specific cortex development and sensitivity to DDX3X neurodevelopmental syndrome.

=== Microchimerism ===
In 1974, researchers discovered male chromosomes inside fetal white blood cells circulating in the blood of pregnant and recently delivered women. In 1996, a follow-up study found that male fetal progenitor cells can remain in a mother's bloodstream for up to 27 years after giving birth.

A 2004 study at the Fred Hutchinson Cancer Research Center in Seattle investigated why male chromosomes also appear in the blood of women who have never given birth to a son. Among 120 women without sons, 21% carried male DNA in their peripheral blood. When the researchers grouped the women by pregnancy history, male microchimerism was detected across all four categories:

- Group A (8% positive) had given birth only to daughters.
- Group B (22% positive) had a history of one or more miscarriages.
- Group C (57% positive) had undergone medically terminated pregnancies.
- Group D (10% positive) had never been knowingly pregnant.

To explain the presence of Y-chromosome DNA in women without sons, including the 10% who had never been knowingly pregnant, the authors noted several possible sources:

- earlier unrecognized miscarriages,
- terminated pregnancies,
- a vanished male twin absorbed early in the woman's own embryonic development,
- transfer of male cells from sexual intercourse.

In 2012, researchers at the same institute also detected cells carrying a Y chromosome across multiple regions of the postmortem brains of women.

== Comparative genomics and structural conservation ==
=== Environmental and homomorphic sex determination ===
Cold-blooded (ectothermic) vertebrates determine sex through a wide variety of genetic and environmental systems. Under a light microscope, many amphibians, bony (teleost) fishes, and reptiles do not have visibly distinct (heteromorphic) sex chromosomes like the mammalian X and Y. High-resolution genome mapping has shown that many of these species still determine sex genetically using homomorphic (cryptic) sex chromosomes that look structurally identical to ordinary non-sex chromosomes (autosomes), while others rely on environmental sex determination. In many reptiles and some fishes, an embryo's sex is set by the incubation temperature of the egg (temperature-dependent sex determination). Some vertebrates are hermaphrodites. Most of these are sequential hermaphrodites that change sex during their lifetime, producing either male or female gametes at different life stages rather than both at once. By contrast, simultaneous hermaphroditism, in which an individual produces both sperm and eggs at the same time, occurs mainly in invertebrates and in only a few orders of fishes among vertebrates.

=== Comparative architecture and homology ===
In therian mammals (eutherian placental mammals and marsupials), the X and Y chromosomes share matching pairing regions at their tips (the pseudoautosomal regions) as well as older blocks of shared X-degenerate sequence. While the X chromosome has kept a large, autosome-like set of genes, the therian Y chromosome has become specialized around three groups of genes: the male sex-determining gene SRY, multicopy gene families active in the testes for sperm production, and a conserved core of dosage-sensitive housekeeping genes expressed throughout the body.

Comparative genome sequencing of the platypus, marsupials, and placental mammals has shown that the therian XY system arose independently from the sex chromosomes of egg-laying mammals (monotremes). Genes found on the X and Y chromosomes of marsupials and placental mammals sit on ordinary autosomes in monotremes and birds. In contrast, monotreme sex chromosomes lack SRY and share extensive sequence homology with the Z sex chromosome of birds.

=== Recombination suppression ===
Unlike autosomes, which pair up and swap DNA along their entire length during meiosis, the X and Y chromosomes pair and recombine only within two short pseudoautosomal regions (PAR1 and PAR2) at their tips. Across the remaining 95% of the Y chromosome (the male-specific region, or MSY), crossing over between the X and Y chromosomes is blocked. This block keeps male sex-determination and sperm-production genes (such as SRY, TSPY, RBMY, and DAZ) locked onto the Y chromosome. If the MSY recombined freely with the X chromosome during meiosis, these male-specific genes would be transferred onto the X chromosome or lost, leading to disorders of sex development and male infertility.

==== Palindromic gene conversion, inversion toggling, and amplicon rescue ====
Unlike other chromosomes, the male-specific region of the Y chromosome (MSY) cannot swap DNA with a matching partner chromosome during cell division. Without such inter-chromosomal X–Y recombination, harmful mutations would ordinarily build up irreversibly over generations, a process known as Muller's ratchet. To prevent this decay, the human Y chromosome relies on an internal self-repair system based on gene conversion across nine large palindromes (designated P1 through P9) and tandem repeat arrays located in its active, gene-rich regions (euchromatin). Each palindrome consists of two mirror-image DNA "arms" ranging from 8.7 kilobase pairs (kbp) to 1.45 megabase pairs (Mbp) in length that share up to 99.97% identical nucleotide sequences. During DNA replication or repair, the chromosome folds back on itself into a hairpin shape so that the two arms line up side by side. An undamaged gene copy on one arm then acts as a template to overwrite and repair a mutated copy on the opposite arm through intra-chromosomal non-allelic homologous recombination (NAHR), a process in which the chromosome recombines with itself.

Complete, gap-free Telomere-to-Telomere (T2T) sequences of 43 diverse human Y chromosomes have shown that this self-pairing across inverted repeats also flips large segments of DNA backward and forward (structural inversions) across roughly half of the male-specific euchromatic region. Out of 14 euchromatic inversions (plus two fixed inversions bordering the Yq12 heterochromatic block), 12 (85%) are recurrent. These segments have flipped back and forth between 2 and 13 times across the human Y family tree at more than twice the rate seen on non-sex chromosomes (autosomes) or the X chromosome. This corresponds to 1 recurrent inversion for every 603 father-to-son transmissions, or a rate of 3.68 × 10^{−5} to 2.39 × 10^{−4} per locus per generation.

In a study of 1,216 males from the 1000 Genomes Project and 142 near-complete Y assemblies, 16.9% of men were found to carry a deletion or duplication in their Y-chromosome amplicons (long, repeated DNA segments housing multi-copy fertility genes). Despite this high rate of structural change, natural selection against harmful variants (purifying selection) and gene conversion restore the ancestral number of gene copies through a mutation-selection balance termed "amplicon rescue".

Because the MSY is passed down intact from father to son without recombining with the X chromosome, it preserves a continuous patrilineal genetic record (haplotype) used to reconstruct human population history and male-line ancestry.

=== Gene content stability and refutation of the linear decay model ===
In the early 2000s, before complete primate Y-chromosome sequences were available, some geneticists proposed that the human Y chromosome was steadily degenerating and would eventually disappear. A widely cited 2004 estimate assumed that the human Y chromosome had lost 1,393 of an original 1,438 ancestral genes (leaving about 45 genes). Using a linear extrapolation of 4.6 genes lost per million years, this model predicted that the human Y chromosome would lose all of its functional genes within 5 to 10 million years.

Subsequent complete sequencing of the human, great ape, and rhesus macaque Y chromosomes disproved this linear decay hypothesis. In 2023, the gapless Telomere-to-Telomere (T2T-Y) assembly established that the human Y chromosome actually contains 106 protein-coding genes and 693 genes in total, more than double the coding gene count assumed in 2004.

Comparative sequencing of the human and chimpanzee Y chromosomes further showed how stable the human Y gene repertoire has remained. Although non-coding DNA and multi-copy ampliconic regions diverge rapidly between the two species (so that only about 45% of the human Y DNA sequence aligns directly to the chimpanzee Y in gapless T2T assemblies), the human Y chromosome has not lost a single ancestral X-degenerate gene (single-copy genes surviving from the ancient autosome that gave rise to the X and Y chromosomes) since the human and chimpanzee lineages split. Whereas the chimpanzee Y chromosome lost the function of 4 out of 16 X-degenerate genes (TBL1Y, TMSB4Y, USP9Y, and TXLNGY) as well as the ampliconic gene HSFY, the human Y chromosome kept all 16 working. A broader comparison between the human and rhesus macaque Y chromosomes showed that neither species lost any ancestral genes across the four oldest strata of the chromosome, and only one ancestral gene was lost in the youngest layer of the human Y chromosome compared to the macaque.

In 2014, Daniel Bellott, David Page, and colleagues compared Y chromosomes across eight mammalian species and found that the surviving single-copy X-degenerate genes on the human Y chromosome (UTY, KDM5D, ZFY, DDX3Y, EIF1AY, RPS4Y1, USP9Y, TBL1Y, TMSB4Y, NLGN4Y, and TXLNGY) were not retained by chance. These genes act throughout the body as dosage-sensitive regulators of fundamental cellular processes, including chromatin modification, gene transcription, RNA splicing, protein synthesis (translation initiation), and protein stability. Strong purifying selection weeds out protein-changing mutations in these genes, giving them a much lower ratio of protein-altering to silent mutations (dN/dS) than single-copy X-chromosome genes (P < 3.39 × 10^{−4}). Human cells require two active copies of these regulatory genes to function normally. In 46,XX females, one of the two X chromosomes is mostly silenced through X-inactivation, but the X-chromosome counterparts of these specific Y genes escape silencing so that every somatic cell retains two working copies. In 46,XY males, the Y-chromosome copies supply that essential second dose during embryonic development; without a second sex chromosome to provide these genes, more than 99% of human 45,X embryos die before birth.

==== Germline mutation dynamics ====
Because the Y chromosome is passed down exclusively from father to son, it spends every generation in the male germline inside sperm-producing stem cells (spermatogonia). These cells undergo dozens of rounds of mitotic cell division during gametogenesis before maturing into spermatozoa stored in the epididymis. Across the whole human genome, 75% to 81% of all newly arising (de novo) germline mutations come from the father. Multi-generation family studies have shown that this roughly 3:1 to 4:1 male-to-female mutation ratio is already present in young fathers and remains similar across mammal species with very different reproductive lifespans. This indicates that sex-specific differences in DNA damage and repair, alongside repeated stem-cell divisions, drive the higher male mutation rate.

In April 2025, researchers used five sequencing technologies to assemble near-complete genomes across a four-generation, 28-member human family (CEPH 1463) and directly measured the mutation rate per generation across all regions of the Y chromosome. Across the entire diploid human genome, an average of 192 de novo mutations arose per generation, including 75.5 single-base changes (single-nucleotide variants), 7.4 small insertions or deletions (indels) outside tandem repeats, 79.6 tandem-repeat indels and large structural variants, 7.7 centromeric mutations, and 12.4 Y-chromosome events. The Y chromosome alone gained an average of 12.4 new mutations per father-to-son transmission. Although the 62.46 Mbp Y chromosome makes up only about 1% of a man's total diploid genome (or 2% of a single haploid chromosome set), it accounts for 6.46% of all new germline mutations per generation because it is always transmitted through the male germline and consists of 84.9% repetitive DNA.

==== Haplotype selection and sequence conservation ====
Because the MSY does not swap segments with the X chromosome, natural selection acts on the entire non-recombining Y chromosome as a single linked block (haplotype) rather than on individual genes in isolation. In non-coding regions, this linkage can allow neutral or slightly harmful mutations to spread alongside beneficial ones (genetic hitchhiking), eliminate neutral variation when nearby harmful mutations are purged (background selection), and permit the insertion of mobile genetic elements (retrotransposons).

Complete T2T sequencing across human populations has shown that strong purifying selection and active structural constraints protect the functional genes and overall architecture of the Y chromosome. Across 43 diverse human Y chromosomes representing 182,900 years of human divergence, the non-repetitive euchromatic regions of the Y chromosome show very low sequence variation, averaging 5.72 single-nucleotide variants (SNVs), 2.11 indels, and 0.01 structural variants per megabase—a level of nucleotide diversity lower than that found on the X chromosome. In addition, across the massive repetitive heterochromatic region Yq12, alternating DYZ1 and DYZ2 satellite arrays consistently preserve a 1:1 copy-number ratio of repeat units across human lineages.

==== Effective population size and patrilineal bottlenecks ====
In a population with equal numbers of breeding males and females, there are only one-fourth as many Y chromosomes as any non-sex chromosome (autosome) and one-third as many Y chromosomes as X chromosomes, because every person carries two copies of each autosome and females carry two X chromosomes, whereas only males carry a single Y chromosome. This smaller effective population size (N_{e}) makes Y-chromosome lineages more sensitive to random fluctuations in survival and reproduction (genetic drift), especially when fathers have only daughters or when a small fraction of men father a large share of offspring.

At several points in human history, social and reproductive patterns have intensified this effect. During the Neolithic Y-chromosome bottleneck roughly 5,000 to 7,000 years ago, the global effective population size of reproducing males dropped to about 1/17th that of females before recovering. Early theoretical models suggested that a small effective population size could speed up the buildup of harmful mutations through Muller's ratchet, but genomic studies show that purifying selection and intra-chromosomal gene conversion prevent the decay of protein-coding genes on the human Y chromosome.

=== Gene conversion and self-repair ===
Although the MSY does not recombine with the X chromosome, researchers at the Massachusetts Institute of Technology (MIT) discovered in 2003 that the human Y chromosome repairs its own multi-copy genes through intra-chromosomal gene conversion ("self-recombination") across giant inverted repeat palindromes.

The euchromatic portion of the human Y chromosome contains nine large palindromes (P1 through P9) whose opposing mirror-image arms measure up to 1.45 megabases each, share up to 99.97% sequence identity, and carry multi-copy gene families required for sperm production and male fertility (DAZ, CDY, BPY2, RBMY, PRY, HSFY, VCY, and XKRY). Because the Y chromosome has no partner chromosome across the MSY, it maintains backup copies of these genes on opposite arms of its palindromes. When a mutation occurs on one arm, the chromosome folds into a hairpin structure during meiosis and uses the unmutated opposite arm as a template to overwrite and fix the mutation without crossing over. Comparative sequencing has confirmed that palindromic gene conversion operates across the Y chromosomes of humans, chimpanzees, bonobos, and gorillas.

During meiosis, individual gene conversion events on the human Y chromosome overwrite stretches averaging about 2,068 base pairs in length, show a repair preference for guanine and cytosine bases over adenine and thymine (GC-biased gene conversion), and take place at a rate of roughly 1.52 × 10^{−5} conversions per base per year. When the folded chromosome resolves a repair event by crossing over between the two arms rather than simply copying a short tract, it flips the intervening DNA segment (a balanced inversion). Across 43 diverse human Y chromosomes, 12 of 14 euchromatic inversions flip back and forth recurrently across the Y family tree at a rate of 1 recurrent inversion per 603 father-to-son transmissions (3.68 × 10^{−5} to 2.39 × 10^{−4} per locus per generation).

Subsequent genomic studies further demonstrated the resilience of Y-chromosome repeat arrays. In an analysis of 1,216 males from the 1000 Genomes Project and 142 near-complete Y assemblies, Levi Teitz, David Page, and colleagues showed that although 16.9% of men carry a deletion or duplication of a Y-chromosome amplicon, the ancestral copy numbers and functional domain structures of these repeat units are maintained across all major branches of the human Y tree (including the earliest-diverging A00 lineage). Through a balance of mutation, natural selection, and gene-conversion-mediated "amplicon rescue", duplicated amplicons act as templates to rebuild deleted copies.

=== Stability and alternative mammalian sex-determination systems ===
Comparisons between humans and rhesus macaques show that across 25 million years of divergence, all 18 ancestral genes in the oldest strata of the Y chromosome have remained fully preserved in both species, with zero gene losses recorded. These data show that primate Y-chromosome gene content has reached a state of long-term stability.

A few specialized rodent species in the related families Muridae and Cricetidae have developed unusual modifications to the standard mammalian XY sex-determination system. Whole-genome sequencing of these rodents between 2016 and 2022 showed that even in species where a separate Y chromosome no longer exists, essential ancestral Y-chromosome genes were moved onto other chromosomes rather than lost:

- In the endangered Ryukyu spiny rats (Tokudaia osimensis and Tokudaia tokunoshimensis), both males and females have a 2n = 45,XO chromosome set and lack a separate Y chromosome or the Sry gene. Essential ancestral Y-chromosome genes involved in sperm production (including Eif2s3y, Zfy, Kdm5d, and Tspy) were relocated (translocated) onto the X chromosome. In November 2022, Miho Terao, Asato Kuroiwa, and colleagues identified the male sex-determining trigger in T. osimensis: males carry a 17 kbp tandem duplication on autosome 3 (430 kbp upstream of the testis-determining gene Sox9). This duplicated segment contains a regulatory enhancer sequence (Enh14) that switches on Sox9 in the developing embryonic gonad without needing Sry.
- Among mole voles (Ellobius lutescens [also classified as Bramus lutescens], Ellobius talpinus, and Ellobius tancrei), both males and females of E. lutescens carry a single X chromosome (XO), whereas both sexes of E. talpinus and E. tancrei carry two X chromosomes (XX). Whole-genome sequencing of E. lutescens and E. talpinus in 2016 showed that both species kept vital ancestral Y-chromosome genes, specifically Eif2s3y (which is required for male meiotic division in mice) and Zfy, by transferring them onto the X chromosome.
- In the creeping vole (Microtus oregoni), a complete genome assembly in May 2021 mapped its sex chromosomes. Rather than losing its Y-chromosome genes, M. oregoni fused its ancestral Y-chromosome sequences (including multiple copies of Sry, Uty, Kdm5d, Zfy, Ddx3y, and Eif2s3y) onto an X chromosome. This fusion produced two distinct X chromosomes: a standard maternal X chromosome and a male-determining X chromosome (X^{Y}) that is passed down through males via programmed chromosome non-separation (nondisjunction).
- In the wood lemming (Myopus schisticolor), the Arctic lemming (Dicrostonyx torquatus), and several grass mouse species of the genus Akodon, genetic modifiers on the X or Y chromosome override the usual male-determining signal to produce fertile XY females alongside standard XX females and XY males.

Outside of rodents, the black muntjac deer (Muntiacus crinifrons) formed enlarged neo-X and neo-Y chromosomes when its ancestral sex chromosomes fused with autosomes. In other mammals, complete long-read sequences of the house mouse (Mus musculus), cattle (Bos taurus), and sheep (Ovis aries) Y chromosomes uncovered large, species-specific expansions of multi-copy gene families in active euchromatin alongside conserved single-copy X-degenerate genes. Although the house mouse Y chromosome kept only 9 ancestral X-degenerate genes, its long arm expanded into a nearly 90-megabase euchromatic region carrying roughly 700 protein-coding genes duplicated from newly acquired gene families (Sly, Ssty1, Ssty2, and Srsy). These Y-linked multi-copy genes compete in an intragenomic conflict with matching multi-copy gene families on the mouse X chromosome (Slx and Slxl1) that oppositely regulate post-meiotic sex-chromosome gene repression, sperm-head morphology, and offspring sex ratio. In other mammals, complete long-read sequences of the house mouse (Mus musculus), cattle (Bos taurus), and sheep (Ovis aries) Y chromosomes uncovered large, species-specific expansions of multi-copy gene families in active euchromatin alongside conserved single-copy X-degenerate genes. Although the house mouse Y chromosome kept only 9 ancestral X-degenerate genes, its long arm expanded into a nearly 90-megabase euchromatic region carrying roughly 700 protein-coding genes duplicated from newly acquired gene families (Sly, Ssty1, Ssty2, and Srsy). These Y-linked multi-copy genes compete in an intragenomic conflict with matching multi-copy gene families on the mouse X chromosome (Slx and Slxl1) that oppositely control the shutdown of sex-chromosome gene expression after meiosis, the shape of developing sperm heads, and the ratio of male to female offspring.

=== 1:1 sex ratio ===
Fisher's principle explains why almost all sexually reproducing species maintain an even 1:1 ratio of males to females. In his 1967 paper on "Extraordinary sex ratios", W. D. Hamilton summarized the mechanism assuming that male and female offspring require equal parental investment to raise:

1. Suppose male births are less common than female.
2. A newborn male then has better mating prospects than a newborn female, and therefore can expect to have more offspring.
3. Therefore, parents genetically disposed to produce males tend to have more than average numbers of grandchildren born to them.
4. Therefore, the genes for male-producing tendencies spread, and male births become more common.
5. As the 1:1 sex ratio is approached, the advantage associated with producing males dies away.
6. The same reasoning holds if females are substituted for males throughout. Therefore, 1:1 is the equilibrium ratio.

== Non-therian Y chromosome ==
Many organisms outside of therian mammals (placental mammals and marsupials) also have Y chromosomes, but these arose independently from different ancestral chromosomes and share no common DNA sequence origin (homology) with the therian Y chromosome. Such groups include egg-laying mammals (monotremes), fruit flies (Drosophila) and other true flies (Diptera), several bony fishes (teleosts), certain reptiles, and dioecious flowering plants (species with separate male and female plants).

In flowering plants, classical genetic experiments by Mogens Westergaard on Melandrium album (now Silene latifolia, the white campion) showed that male plant development is triggered by the presence of a dominant Y chromosome rather than simply by the ratio of X chromosomes to autosomes. By studying plants with missing pieces of the Y chromosome, Westergaard found that separate regions of the plant Y chromosome suppress female flower organs (carpels) and promote male flower organs (stamens). In February 2025, complete assemblies of the giant ~550 Mbp Silene latifolia Y chromosome (which is larger than the plant's ~350 Mbp X chromosome because of an expansion of repetitive DNA elements) mapped its two main non-recombining layers and identified the specific Y-linked female-suppressing gene (GSFY / CLAVATA3-like) and male-promoting regions that Westergaard had predicted.

In the fruit fly Drosophila melanogaster, the Y chromosome does not determine whether an embryo becomes male or female; sex is determined instead by the number of X chromosomes. As a result, XXY fruit flies develop into fertile females, while X0 flies (carrying a single X and no Y chromosome) develop into sterile males because the ~40 Mbp D. melanogaster Y chromosome carries genes required for sperm production (in contrast to certain related species such as Drosophila bifurca and Drosophila affinis, where X0 males are both viable and fertile). Aside from its 13 protein-coding male fertility genes, the D. melanogaster Y chromosome consists almost entirely of repetitive satellite DNA and tightly packed heterochromatin that acts as a genome-wide epigenetic regulator (a "chromatin sink"). This large block of Y heterochromatin binds and soaks up limited cellular supplies of gene-silencing heterochromatin proteins (such as HP1a) and H3K9me2/3 histone methyltransferase enzymes (Su(var)3-9). That redistribution alters how repressive chromatin marks are spread across the rest of the genome. Even in XXY female flies where Y-chromosome protein-coding genes are inactive, the physical presence of a Y chromosome changes the activity of more than 1,000 autosomal genes, suppresses all 33 maternal mitochondrial genes (P < 0.001), reduces the expression of 69 out of 93 pre-synaptic and 38 out of 47 post-synaptic brain genes, and affects egg production, body size, movement, and lifespan.

=== ZW chromosomes ===
Some animals have a reversed sex-chromosome system in which males carry two matching sex chromosomes (ZZ, the homogametic sex) and females carry two different sex chromosomes (ZW, the heterogametic sex). This ZW system is found in birds, advanced (caenophidian) snakes, and Lepidoptera (butterflies and moths). In 2017 and 2021, comparative studies of bird W chromosomes and caenophidian snake W chromosomes by Daniel Bellott and David Page showed that although mammalian Y chromosomes, bird W chromosomes, and snake W chromosomes originated independently from different ancestral autosomes, all three sex-specific chromosomes selectively retained broadly active, dosage-sensitive regulatory genes that control gene transcription, chromatin modification, and protein translation.

=== Non-inverted Y chromosome ===
In several bony fishes (teleosts), such as the Japanese rice fish (medaka, Oryzias latipes), the X and Y chromosomes are nearly identical in size and appearance (homomorphic) and still swap DNA across almost their entire length, except within a small ~250 kbp male-specific segment on the Y chromosome. This segment carries a single working gene, the master male sex-determining gene DMY (dmrt1bY, a duplicated copy of the autosomal transcription factor gene dmrt1). Because the rest of the medaka Y chromosome carries the exact same set of genes as the X chromosome, artificially hormone-reversed XX males and YY females are completely viable and fertile.

=== Multiple XY pairs ===
Egg-laying mammals (monotremes) have multiple pairs of XY sex chromosomes: male platypuses carry five X and five Y chromosomes (X_{1}Y_{1}X_{2}Y_{2}X_{3}Y_{3}X_{4}Y_{4}X_{5}Y_{5}), while male echidnas carry five X and four Y chromosomes. Because neighboring sex chromosomes share matching tip regions (pseudoautosomal regions), all ten sex chromosomes link end-to-end in an alternating zig-zag chain during male meiosis so that the five X chromosomes move into one sperm cell (XXXXX) and the five Y chromosomes move into the other (YYYYY).

Platypus sex chromosomes share extensive gene homology with the bird Z chromosome (including a copy of the bird sex-determining gene DMRT1 on platypus X_{5}) and lack the therian SRY gene. In May 2025, comparative genomic and developmental studies of the platypus and echidna identified a Y-chromosome copy of the anti-Müllerian hormone gene (AMHY, located on the oldest monotreme Y chromosome, Y_{5}) as the primary male sex-determining gene in monotremes.

== See also ==
- Genealogical DNA test
- Genetic genealogy
- Haplodiploid sex-determination system
- Human Y chromosome DNA haplogroups
- List of Y-STR markers
- Mosaic loss of chromosome Y
- Muller's ratchet
- Single nucleotide polymorphism
- Y chromosome Short Tandem Repeat (STR)
- Y linkage
- Y-chromosomal Aaron
- Y-chromosomal Adam
- Y-chromosome haplogroups in populations of the world
