= KDM5D =

Protein-coding gene in the species Homo sapiens

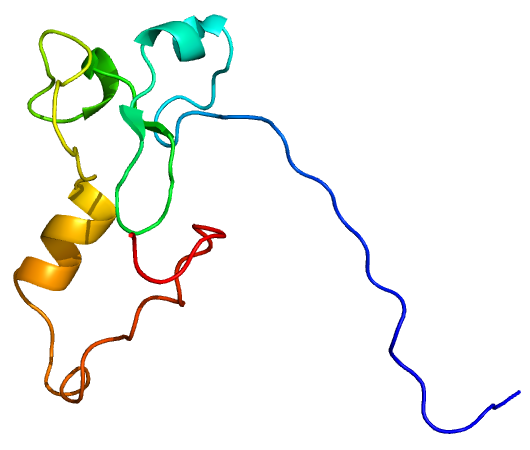

Identifiers
- Aliases: KDM5D, HY, HYA, JARID1D, SMCY, lysine demethylase 5D
- External IDs: OMIM: 426000; MGI: 99780; GeneCards: KDM5D
Available structures
PDB	Ortholog search: PDBe RCSB
PDB	List of PDB id codes 2E6R, 2YQE
Enzyme activity
EC #	BRENDA	ExPASy	KEGG	MetaCyc
1.14.11.67	↗	↗	↗	↗

Gene location (Human)
Chr.	Y chromosome (human)
Band	Yq11.223	Start	19,703,865 bp
Band	Yq11.223	End	19,744,939 bp

Gene location (Mouse)
Chr.	Y chromosome (mouse)
Band	Y|Ypter	Start	897,788 bp
Band	Y|Ypter	End	956,786 bp
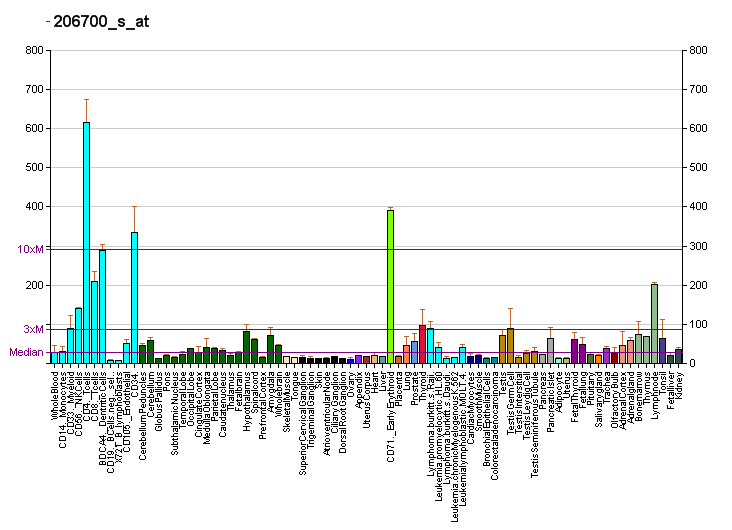
RNA expression pattern
Bgee	Human / Mouse (ortholog); Top expressed in: apex of heart; rectum; right lung; prostate; skin of thigh; mucosa of transverse colon; urethra; trabecular bone; gonad; Brodmann area 9 / Top expressed in: tail of embryo; left lung lobe; internal carotid artery; external carotid artery; female urethra; granulocyte; male urethra; vas deferens; triceps brachii muscle; epithelium of stomach; More reference expression data
BioGPS	More reference expression data
Gene ontology
Molecular function	histone H3-methyl-lysine-4 demethylase activity; DNA binding; oxidoreductase activity; dioxygenase activity; metal ion binding; histone demethylase activity; androgen receptor binding; protein binding; DNA-binding transcription factor activity, RNA polymerase II-specific; DNA-binding transcription repressor activity, RNA polymerase II-specific; chromatin binding; histone H3-tri/di/monomethyl-lysine-4 demethylase activity; methylated histone binding
Cellular component	nucleus; nucleoplasm; fibrillar center; cellular component; histone methyltransferase complex
Biological process	histone H3-K4 demethylation; T cell antigen processing and presentation; transcription, DNA-templated; regulation of transcription, DNA-templated; regulation of androgen receptor signaling pathway; chromatin organization; regulation of transcription by RNA polymerase II; negative regulation of transcription by RNA polymerase II; histone H3-K4 demethylation, trimethyl-H3-K4-specific; chromatin remodeling
Sources:Amigo / QuickGO
Orthologs
Databases	NCBI: entry; OMA: entry
Species	Human	Mouse
Entrez	8284	20592
Ensembl	ENSG00000012817	ENSMUSG00000056673
UniProt	Q9BY66	Q62240
RefSeq (mRNA)	NM_001146705; NM_001146706; NM_004653	NM_011419
RefSeq (protein)	NP_001140177; NP_001140178; NP_004644	NP_035549
Location (UCSC)	Chr Y: 19.7 – 19.74 Mb	Chr Y: 0.9 – 0.96 Mb
PubMed search
- Wikidata
View/Edit Human	View/Edit Mouse

Lysine-specific demethylase 5D is an enzyme that in humans is encoded by the KDM5D gene. KDM5D belongs to the alpha-ketoglutarate-dependent hydroxylases superfamily.

This gene encodes a protein containing zinc finger domains. A short peptide derived from this protein is a minor histocompatibility antigen which can lead to graft rejection of male donor cells in a female recipient.
