= Y-linked deafness, type 1 =

- Other names: DFNY1
- This condition is one of the few known (and confirmed) to be caused by mutations in the Y chromosome.
- Specialty: Medical genetics, Audiology
- Symptoms: Progressive hearing impairment that occurs in all male members of a family.
- Usual onset: Variable
- Duration: Lifelong (and progressing)
- Causes: Genetic mutation
- Prevention: none
- Treatment: Common methods such as Cochlear implant or hearing aids
- Prognosis: With support, good
- Frequency: rare, only two extended Chinese families have been described in medical literature
- Deaths: -

Y-linked deafness, type 1 is a very rare type of hereditary non-syndromic deafness characterized by progressive hearing loss that exclusively affects males. It has been described in 42 males from 2 multi-generational Chinese families.

== Heredity ==
As the name implies, this condition is inherited in a Y-linked (also known as holandric) manner, this means that, if a male has the mutation for this condition, he will pass it to all of his male children, but not to any of his female children. Said male children will then pass the mutation to all their male offspring and this will continue for generations. These particular mutations have to be present in genes in the Y chromosome.

== Cases ==
Wang et al. discovered this condition in 2004 when he described a 7-generation Chinese family from Jiangxi Province, where all male members suffered from progressive hearing loss. The youngest affected member was 7 years old. Out of these individuals, three reported suffering from tinnitus as well.

The same team of researchers (Wang et al.) provided a follow-up for said family in 2009; 2 previously unreported generations of the same 7-generation family were discovered. Out of 25 living males in the family, 23 were diagnosed or reported to have hearing impairments. Out of those 23, 21 went through audiologic examination, and out of the 21 males, 3 had mild hearing impairments, 7 had moderate hearing impairments, and 11 had severe hearing impairments. Further audiometry studies found that out of these males, 10 had difficulties detecting high-frequency sounds, 8 had difficulties detecting sounds from all frequencies, and 3 had "U-shaped" readings. The average age of onset for hearing loss in males of the family was 11.5, examination of family history revealed that the family had been living in the same isolated Jiangxi Province village for well over 2 centuries (200 years). The first man with hearing impairment within the family was believed to have been born in 1847 and to have died in 1898.

In 2011, Fu et al. described a 5-generation Tujia Chinese family where 19 males were affected with hearing impairment. Out of these males, 1 had mild hearing impairment, 5 had moderate hearing impairment, and 10 had severe hearing impairment. Further audiometric studies found that 47% of these males had difficulties detecting high-frequency sounds while 41% had difficulties detecting sounds of any frequency, which led the authors to believe that the hearing loss was also partly influenced by environmental factors. They also found these cases to be consisted with Y-linked inheritance.

== Mapping ==
In 2013, Wang et al. studied the same Chinese family they had described in 2004, this time by carefully sequencing affected males' Y chromosome. Through this, they found complex rearrangements in a region of said chromosome (which was later designated as the DFNY1 locus), the rearrangements consisted of the following:

- Duplication of various non-contiguous segments of the Y chromosome.
- Insertion of nearly 160 kb of genetic data from chromosome 1 into a pericentric region in the short arm of the Y chromosome.

Said 160 kb from chromosome 1 consisted of 5 genes and the 5-prime end of a sixth gene, these genes came from a locus in the same chromosome known to cause a condition called autosomal non-syndromic deafness type 49.
