= CDY1 =

Protein-coding gene in humans

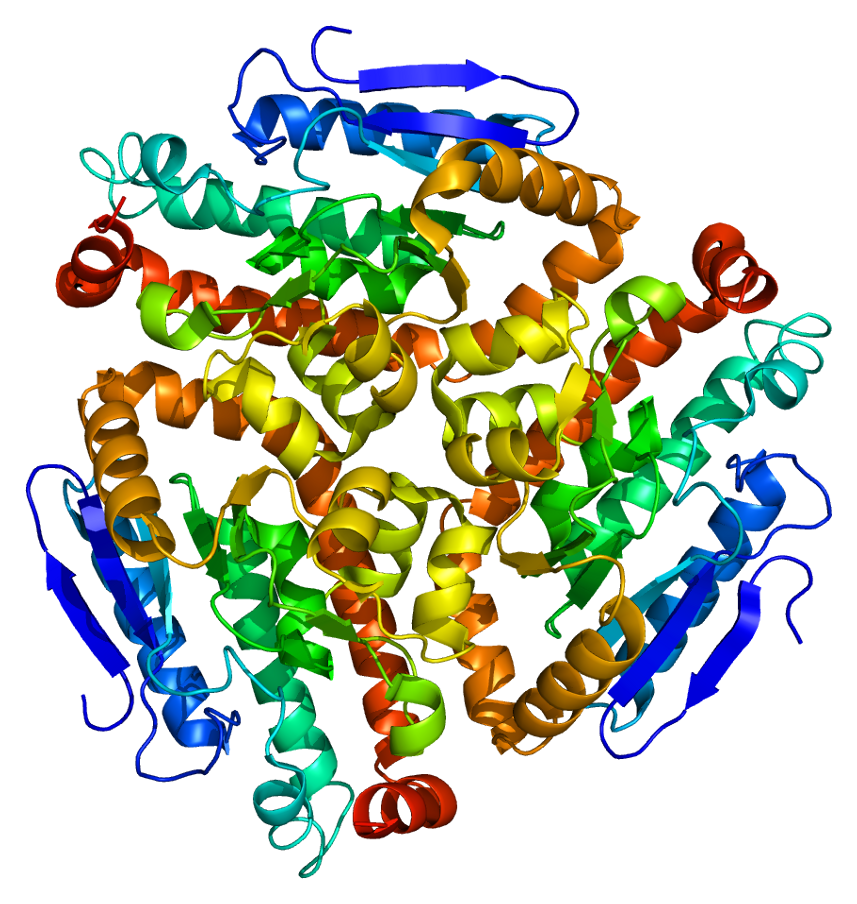

Identifiers
- Aliases: CDY1, CDY, CDY1A, chromodomain protein, Y-linked, 1, chromodomain Y-linked 1
- External IDs: OMIM: 400016; GeneCards: CDY1
Available structures
PDB	Human UniProt search: PDBe RCSB
PDB	List of PDB id codes 2FBM
Enzyme activity
EC #	BRENDA	ExPASy	KEGG	MetaCyc
2.3.1.48	↗	↗	↗	↗

Gene location (Human)
Chr.	Y chromosome (human)
Band	Yq11.23	Start	25,622,162 bp
Band	Yq11.23	End	25,624,902 bp
RNA expression pattern
Bgee	Human / Mouse (ortholog); Top expressed in: left testis; right testis / n/a; More reference expression data
BioGPS	n/a
Gene ontology
Molecular function	histone acetyltransferase activity; methylated histone binding; transferase activity; acyltransferase activity; catalytic activity; transcription corepressor activity
Cellular component	nucleus
Biological process	histone acetylation; metabolism; spermatogenesis; negative regulation of nucleic acid-templated transcription
Sources:Amigo / QuickGO
Orthologs
Databases	NCBI: entry; OMA: entry
Species	Human	Mouse
Entrez	9085	n/a
Ensembl	ENSG00000172288	n/a
UniProt	Q9Y6F8	n/a
RefSeq (mRNA)	NM_004680; NM_170723	n/a
RefSeq (protein)	NP_004671; NP_733841	n/a
Location (UCSC)	Chr Y: 25.62 – 25.62 Mb	n/a
PubMed search		n/a
- Wikidata
View/Edit Human

Testis-specific chromodomain protein Y 1 is a protein that in humans is encoded by the CDY1 gene.

This gene encodes a protein containing a chromodomain and a histone acetyltransferase catalytic domain. Chromodomain proteins are components of heterochromatin-like complexes and can act as gene repressors. This protein is localized to the nucleus of late spermatids where histone hyperacetylation takes place. Histone hyperacetylation is thought to facilitate the transition in which protamines replace histones as the major DNA-packaging protein. The human chromosome Y has two identical copies of this gene within a palindromic region; this record represents the more telomeric copy. Chromosome Y also contains a pair of closely related genes in another more telomeric palindrome as well as several related pseudogenes. Two protein isoforms are encoded by transcript variants of this gene. Additional transcript variants have been described, but their full-length nature has not been determined. The gene is thought to be related to high-altitude adaptation in humans.
