= EIF1AY =

Protein-coding gene in the species Homo sapiens

Identifiers
- Aliases: EIF1AY, eIF-4C, eukaryotic translation initiation factor 1A, Y-linked, eukaryotic translation initiation factor 1A Y-linked
- External IDs: OMIM: 400014; MGI: 1913485; HomoloGene: 100715; GeneCards: EIF1AY; OMA:EIF1AY - orthologs

Gene location (Human)
Chr.	Y chromosome (human)
Band	Yq11.223	Start	20,575,776 bp
Band	Yq11.223	End	20,593,154 bp

Gene location (Mouse)
Chr.	X chromosome (mouse)
Band	X|X F4	Start	158,155,174 bp
Band	X|X F4	End	158,172,924 bp
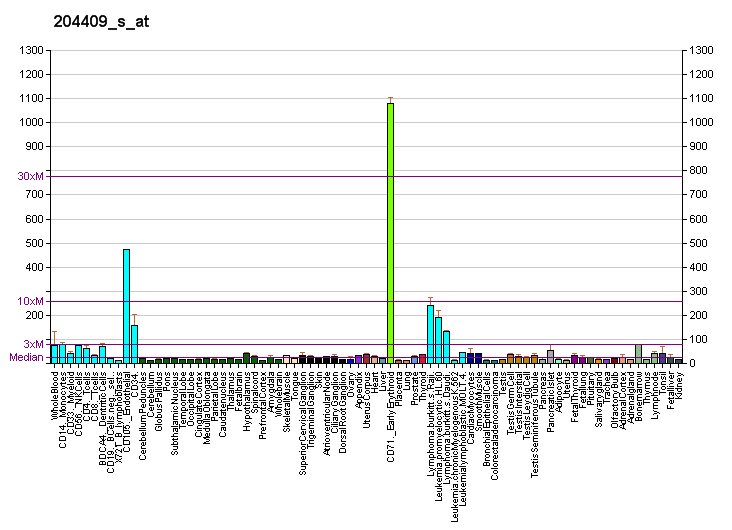

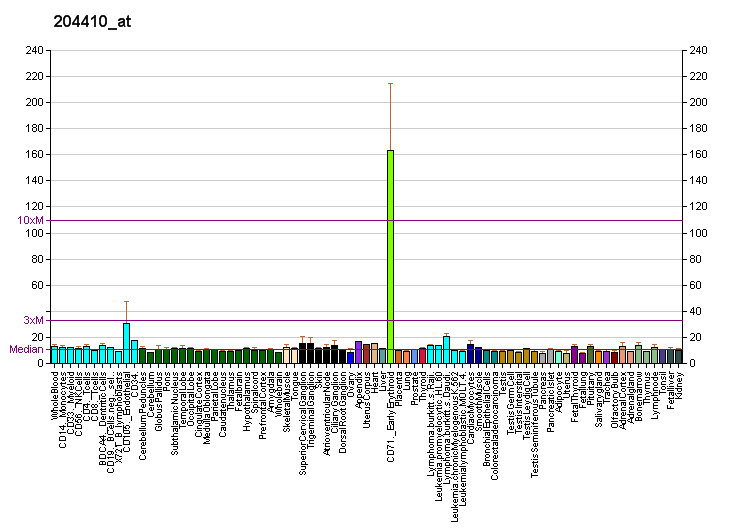
RNA expression pattern
Bgee	Human / Mouse (ortholog); Top expressed in: trabecular bone; vena cava; apex of heart; gonad; rectum; mucosa of transverse colon; right lung; testicle; tendon of biceps brachii; seminal vesicula / Top expressed in: otic placode; saccule; otic vesicle; primitive streak; hair follicle; superior cervical ganglion; medial ganglionic eminence; maxillary prominence; endothelial cell of lymphatic vessel; mandibular prominence; More reference expression data
BioGPS	More reference expression data
Orthologs
Species	Human	Mouse
Entrez	9086	66235
Ensembl	ENSG00000198692	ENSMUSG00000067194
UniProt	O14602	Q8BMJ3
RefSeq (mRNA)	NM_004681; NM_001278612	NM_025437
RefSeq (protein)	NP_001265541; NP_004672	NP_079713
Location (UCSC)	Chr Y: 20.58 – 20.59 Mb	Chr X: 158.16 – 158.17 Mb
PubMed search
- Wikidata
View/Edit Human	View/Edit Mouse

Eukaryotic translation initiation factor 1A, Y-chromosomal is a protein that in humans is encoded by the EIF1AY gene.

Like its X-chromosomal counterpart EIF1AX, it encodes an isoform of eukaryotic translation initiation factor 1A (EIF1A). EIF1A is required for the binding of the 43S complex (a 40S subunit, eIF2/GTP/Met-tRNAi and eIF3) to the 5' end of capped RNA. It has one amino acid difference (M50L) from EIF1AX.
