= DDX3Y =

Protein-coding gene in the species Homo sapiens

Identifiers
- Aliases: DDX3Y, DBY, DEAD-box helicase 3, Y-linked, DEAD-box helicase 3 Y-linked
- External IDs: OMIM: 400010; MGI: 1349406; GeneCards: DDX3Y
Enzyme activity
EC #	BRENDA	ExPASy	KEGG	MetaCyc
3.6.4.13	↗	↗	↗	↗

Gene location (Human)
Chr.	Y chromosome (human)
Band	Yq11.221	Start	12,904,108 bp
Band	Yq11.221	End	12,920,478 bp

Gene location (Mouse)
Chr.	Y chromosome (mouse)
Band	Y|Ypter	Start	1,260,771 bp
Band	Y|Ypter	End	1,286,629 bp
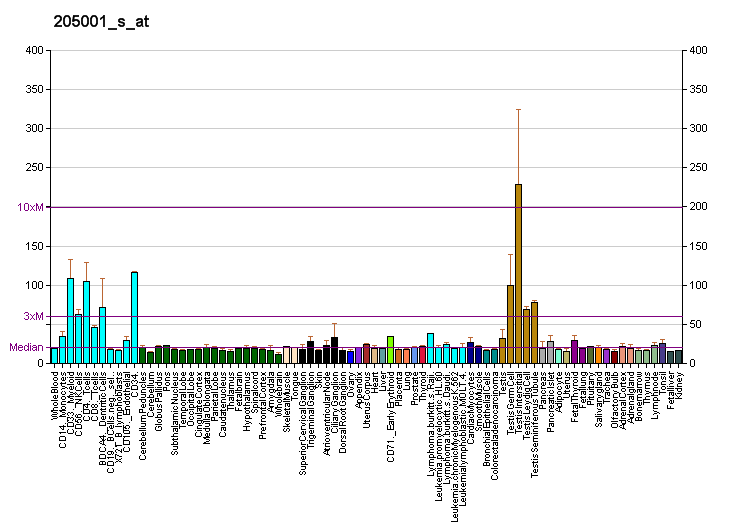

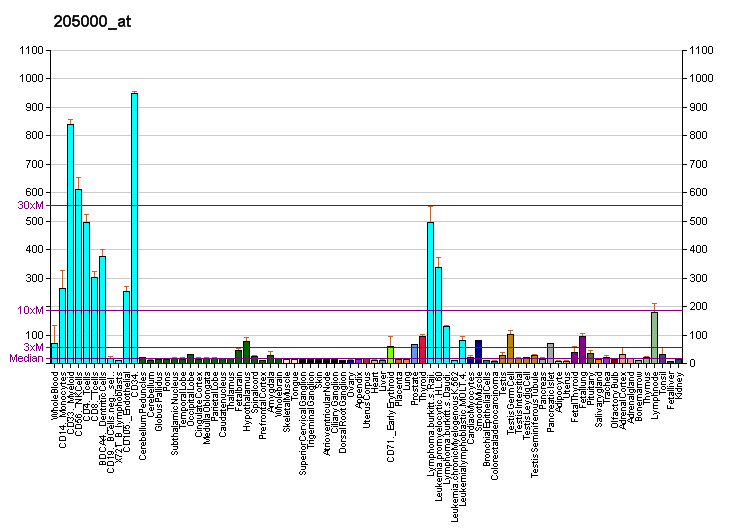
RNA expression pattern
Bgee	Human / Mouse (ortholog); Top expressed in: sperm; endothelial cell; tail of epididymis; skin of thigh; right testis; right lung; left testis; caput epididymis; seminal vesicula; corpus epididymis / Top expressed in: median eminence; dorsomedial hypothalamic nucleus; mammillary body; habenula; arcuate nucleus; subcutaneous adipose tissue; left lung lobe; retinal pigment epithelium; dorsal tegmental nucleus; lobe of cerebellum; More reference expression data
BioGPS	More reference expression data
Gene ontology
Molecular function	DNA binding; nucleotide binding; hydrolase activity; ATP binding; helicase activity; RNA binding; nucleic acid binding
Cellular component	cytoplasmic ribonucleoprotein granule; membrane; nucleus; cytoplasm; cytosol; nucleolus
Biological process	translational initiation; regulation of gene expression; RNA secondary structure unwinding; chromosome segregation
Sources:Amigo / QuickGO
Orthologs
Databases	NCBI: entry; OMA: entry
Species	Human	Mouse
Entrez	8653	26900
Ensembl	ENSG00000067048	ENSMUSG00000069045
UniProt	O15523	Q62095
RefSeq (mRNA)	NM_001122665; NM_001302552; NM_004660; NM_001324195	NM_012008
RefSeq (protein)	NP_001116137; NP_001289481; NP_001311124; NP_004651	NP_036138
Location (UCSC)	Chr Y: 12.9 – 12.92 Mb	Chr Y: 1.26 – 1.29 Mb
PubMed search
- Wikidata
View/Edit Human	View/Edit Mouse

ATP-dependent RNA helicase DDX3Y is an enzyme that in humans is encoded by the DDX3Y gene.

DEAD box proteins, characterized by the conserved motif Asp-Glu-Ala-Asp (DEAD), are putative RNA helicases. They are implicated in a number of cellular processes involving alteration of RNA secondary structure such as translation initiation, nuclear and mitochondrial splicing, and ribosome and spliceosome assembly. Based on their distribution patterns, some members of this family are believed to be involved in embryogenesis, spermatogenesis, and cellular growth and division. This gene encodes a DEAD box protein, and it has a homolog on the X chromosome (DDX3X). The gene mutation causes male infertility, Sertoli cell-only syndrome or severe hypospermatogenesis, suggesting that this gene plays a key role in the spermatogenic process. Alternative splicing of this gene generates 2 transcripts, which differ only in the length of the 3' UTR.
