= PRKY =

Pseudogene in the species Homo sapiens

Identifiers
- Aliases: PRKY, PRKXP3, PRKYP, protein kinase, Y-linked, pseudogene, protein kinase Y-linked (pseudogene)
- External IDs: OMIM: 400008; GeneCards: PRKY

Gene location (Human)
| Chr. | Y chromosome (human) |
| Band | Yp11.2 | Start | 7,273,972 bp |
| Band | Yp11.2 | End | 7,381,548 bp |
Orthologs
| Databases | NCBI: entry; OMA: entry |
| Species | Human | Mouse |
| Entrez | 5616 | n/a |
| Ensembl | ENSG00000099725 | n/a |
| UniProt | n a | n/a |
| RefSeq (mRNA) | NM_002760 | n/a |
| RefSeq (protein) | n/a | n/a |
| Location (UCSC) | Chr Y: 7.27 – 7.38 Mb | n/a |
| PubMed search | | n/a |
- Wikidata
| View/Edit Human |

Serine/threonine-protein kinase PRKY is an enzyme that in humans is encoded by the PRKY gene.

This gene encodes a member of the cAMP-dependent serine/threonine protein kinase family. This gene is located on chromosome Y, near the boundary of the pseudoautosomal region. Abnormal recombination between this gene and a related gene on chromosome X is a frequent cause of XX males and XY females.
