= BPY2 =

Protein-coding gene in the species Homo sapiens

Identifiers
- Aliases: BPY2, BPY2A, VCY2, VCY2A, basic charge, Y-linked, 2, basic charge Y-linked 2
- External IDs: OMIM: 400013; GeneCards: BPY2

Gene location (Human)
Chr.	Y chromosome (human)
Band	Yq11.223	Start	22,973,819 bp
Band	Yq11.223	End	23,005,465 bp
RNA expression pattern
Bgee	Human / Mouse (ortholog); Top expressed in: left testis; right testis; gallbladder; right lobe of liver; human kidney; skin of abdomen; human musculoskeletal system; skeletal muscle; muscle of leg; gastrocnemius muscle / n/a; More reference expression data
BioGPS	n/a
Gene ontology
Molecular function	protein binding; HECT domain binding
Cellular component	nucleus
Biological process	spermatogenesis; single fertilization
Sources:Amigo / QuickGO
Orthologs
Databases	NCBI: entry; OMA: entry
Species	Human	Mouse
Entrez	9083	n/a
Ensembl	ENSG00000183753	n/a
UniProt	O14599	n/a
RefSeq (mRNA)	NM_004678	n/a
RefSeq (protein)	NP_001002760	n/a
Location (UCSC)	Chr Y: 22.97 – 23.01 Mb	n/a
PubMed search		n/a
- Wikidata
View/Edit Human

Testis-specific basic protein Y 2 also known as basic charge, Y-linked 2 is a protein that in humans is encoded by the BPY2 gene which resides on the Y chromosome.

== Function ==
This gene is located in the nonrecombining portion of the Y chromosome, and expressed specifically in testis. The encoded protein interacts with ubiquitin protein ligase E3A and may be involved in male germ cell development and male infertility. Three nearly identical copies of this gene exist on chromosome Y; two copies are part of a palindromic region. This record represents the copy outside of the palindromic region.
