= RNA binding motif protein, Y-linked, family 1, member A1 =

Protein-coding gene in the species Homo sapiens

RBMY1A1
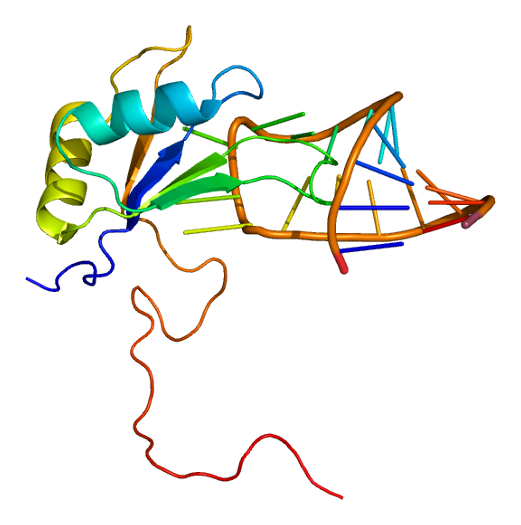

Identifiers
- Aliases: RBMY1A1, RBM, RBM1, RBM2, RBMY, RBMY1C, YRRM1, YRRM2, RNA binding motif protein, Y-linked, family 1, member A1, RNA binding motif protein Y-linked family 1 member A1
- External IDs: OMIM: 400006; GeneCards: RBMY1A1
Available structures
PDB	Human UniProt search: PDBe RCSB
PDB	List of PDB id codes 2FY1

Gene location (Human)
Chr.	Y chromosome (human)
Band	Yq11.223	Start	21,511,372 bp
Band	Yq11.223	End	21,549,326 bp
RNA expression pattern
Bgee	Human / Mouse (ortholog); Top expressed in: testicle; gonad; right testis; left testis; human kidney; renal cortex; placenta; canal of the cervix; fundus; blood / n/a; More reference expression data
BioGPS	n/a
Gene ontology
Molecular function	protein binding; mRNA binding; RNA binding; nucleic acid binding
Cellular component	nucleus; nuclear speck
Biological process	mRNA processing; regulation of alternative mRNA splicing, via spliceosome; RNA splicing; mRNA cis splicing, via spliceosome
Sources:Amigo / QuickGO
Orthologs
Databases	NCBI: entry; OMA: entry
Species	Human	Mouse
Entrez	5940	n/a
Ensembl	ENSG00000234414	n/a
UniProt	P0DJD3	n/a
RefSeq (mRNA)	NM_005058; NM_001320944; NM_001320945	n/a
RefSeq (protein)	NP_001307873; NP_001307874; NP_005049; NP_001006120; NP_001307878 NP_001307879	n/a
Location (UCSC)	Chr Y: 21.51 – 21.55 Mb	n/a
PubMed search		n/a
- Wikidata
View/Edit Human

RNA-binding motif protein, Y chromosome, family 1 member A1/C is a protein that in humans is encoded by the RBMY1A1 gene.

This gene encodes a protein containing an RNA-binding motif in the N-terminus and four SRGY (serine, arginine, glycine, tyrosine) boxes in the C-terminus. Multiple copies of this gene are found in the AZFb azoospermia factor region of chromosome Y and the encoded protein is thought to be involved in spermatogenesis. Most copies of this locus are pseudogenes, although six highly similar copies have full-length ORFs and are considered functional. Four functional copies of this gene are found within inverted repeat IR2; two functional copies of this gene are found in palindrome P3, along with two copies of PTPN13-like, Y-linked. Alternative splicing of transcripts results in two transcript variants that encode different proteins.
