= ZFY =

Protein-coding gene in the species Homo sapiens

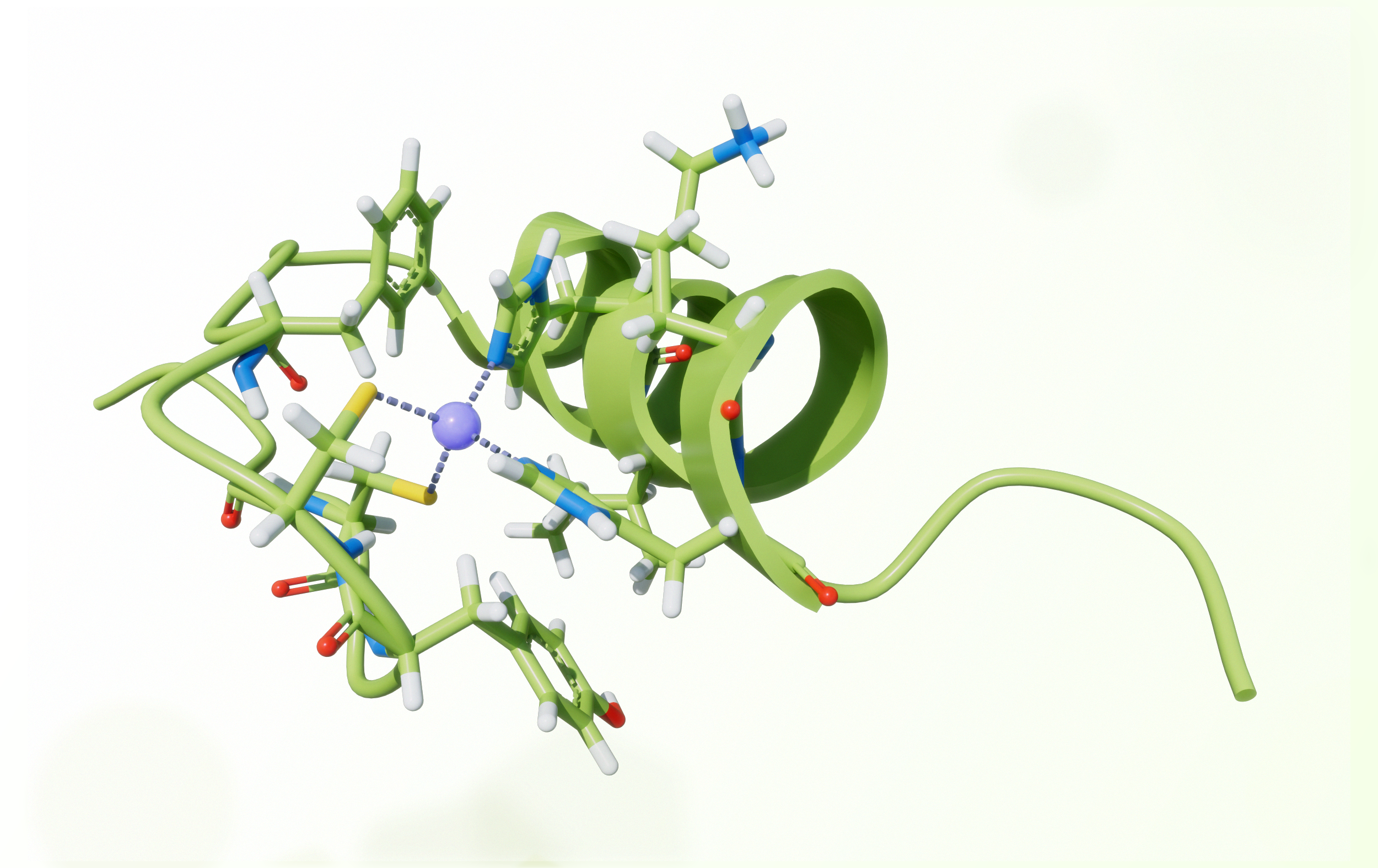

Identifiers
- Aliases: ZFY, ZNF911, zinc finger protein, Y-linked, zinc finger protein Y-linked
- External IDs: OMIM: 490000; GeneCards: ZFY
Available structures
PDB	Human UniProt search: PDBe RCSB
PDB	List of PDB id codes 1KLR, 1KLS, 1XRZ, 5ZNF

Gene location (Human)
Chr.	Y chromosome (human)
Band	Yp11.2	Start	2,935,281 bp
Band	Yp11.2	End	2,982,506 bp
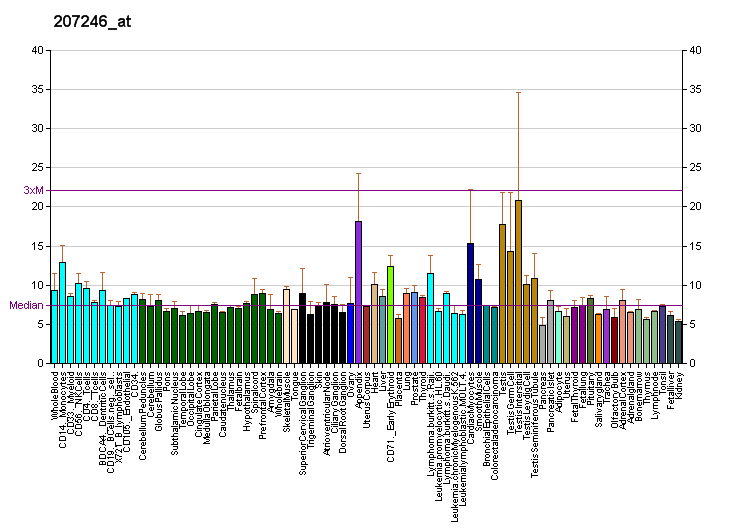
RNA expression pattern
Bgee	Human / Mouse (ortholog); Top expressed in: sperm; gonad; rectum; testicle; parietal pleura; trabecular bone; Achilles tendon; oral cavity; skin of thigh; mucosa of paranasal sinus / n/a; More reference expression data
BioGPS	More reference expression data
Gene ontology
Molecular function	DNA binding; metal ion binding; nucleic acid binding; protein binding; DNA-binding transcription factor activity, RNA polymerase II-specific
Cellular component	nucleus; nucleoplasm; nucleolus
Biological process	multicellular organism development; transcription, DNA-templated; regulation of transcription, DNA-templated; regulation of transcription by RNA polymerase II
Sources:Amigo / QuickGO
Orthologs
Databases	NCBI: entry; OMA: entry
Species	Human	Mouse
Entrez	7544	n/a
Ensembl	ENSG00000067646	n/a
UniProt	P08048	n/a
RefSeq (mRNA)	NM_001145275; NM_001145276; NM_003411	n/a
RefSeq (protein)	NP_001138747; NP_001138748; NP_003402; NP_001356631; NP_001356632 NP_001356633; NP_001356634; NP_001356635; NP_001356636; NP_001356637; NP_001356638; NP_001356639	n/a
Location (UCSC)	Chr Y: 2.94 – 2.98 Mb	n/a
PubMed search		n/a
- Wikidata
View/Edit Human

Zinc finger Y-chromosomal protein is a protein that in humans is encoded by the ZFY gene of the Y chromosome.

This gene encodes a zinc finger-containing protein that may function as a transcription factor. This gene was once a candidate gene for the testis-determining factor (TDF) and was erroneously referred to as TDF.

Humans express a single ZFY gene with two splice variants, while mice express two paralogous copies, Zfy1 and Zfy2. During spermatogenesis, wrongful expression of either Zfy1 or Zfy2 results in programmed cell death, apoptosis, at the mid-pachytene checkpoint. In mice, Zfy genes are necessary for meiotic sex chromosome inactivation (MSCI). In Zfy knockout spermatocytes, sex chromosomes are incorrectly silenced. Thus, Zfy performs three functions at the mid-pachytene checkpoint: (1) promote MSCI, (2) monitor MSCI progress, and (3) execute cells, via apoptosis, that fail to undergo MSCI.

In humans, ZFY is broadly expressed across tissues with particularly high expression in the testis.

Disorders associated with the ZFY gene include campomelic dysplasia, cystadenofibroma, and Frasier syndrome.
