= Daz =

Daz or DAZ may refer to:

== Business and organizations ==
- D.Az., an abbreviation used for the United States District Court for the District of Arizona
- Daz (detergent), a laundry detergent sold in the United Kingdom
- Daz 3D (formerly DAZ Productions), a 3D rendering and animation software company
- Daz Studio, a 3D rendering and animation software product made by the above company

== Media ==
- D.A.Z. (album)
- Daz Black, English YouTuber
- Daz Eden, fictional character from the British ITV soap opera Emmerdale
- Deutsche Allgemeine Zeitung, abbreviation of German historical newspaper

== Places ==
- Daz, Iran, a village in Kerman Province, Iran

== People ==
- Daz Cameron (born 1997), American baseball player
- Daz Dillinger (born 1973), American record producer and rapper
- Daz Sampson (born 1974), British dance music producer and vocalist
- Daz Saund, British DJ
  - Rikki & Daz, a British pop music duo, formed in 2002 by John Matthews and Daz Sampson
- Steve Addazio (born 1959) American college football coach, nicknamed "Daz"

== Science ==
- DAZ protein family
  - DAZ associated protein 1, a protein in humans encoded by the DAZAP1 gene
  - DAZ2, a protein that in humans encoded by the DAZ2 gene
  - DAZ3, a protein that in humans encoded by the DAZ3 gene
