= Sertoli cell-only syndrome =

Type of sperm production impairment

- Other names: Germinal cell aplasia, Del Castillo syndrome, Germ cell aplasia.
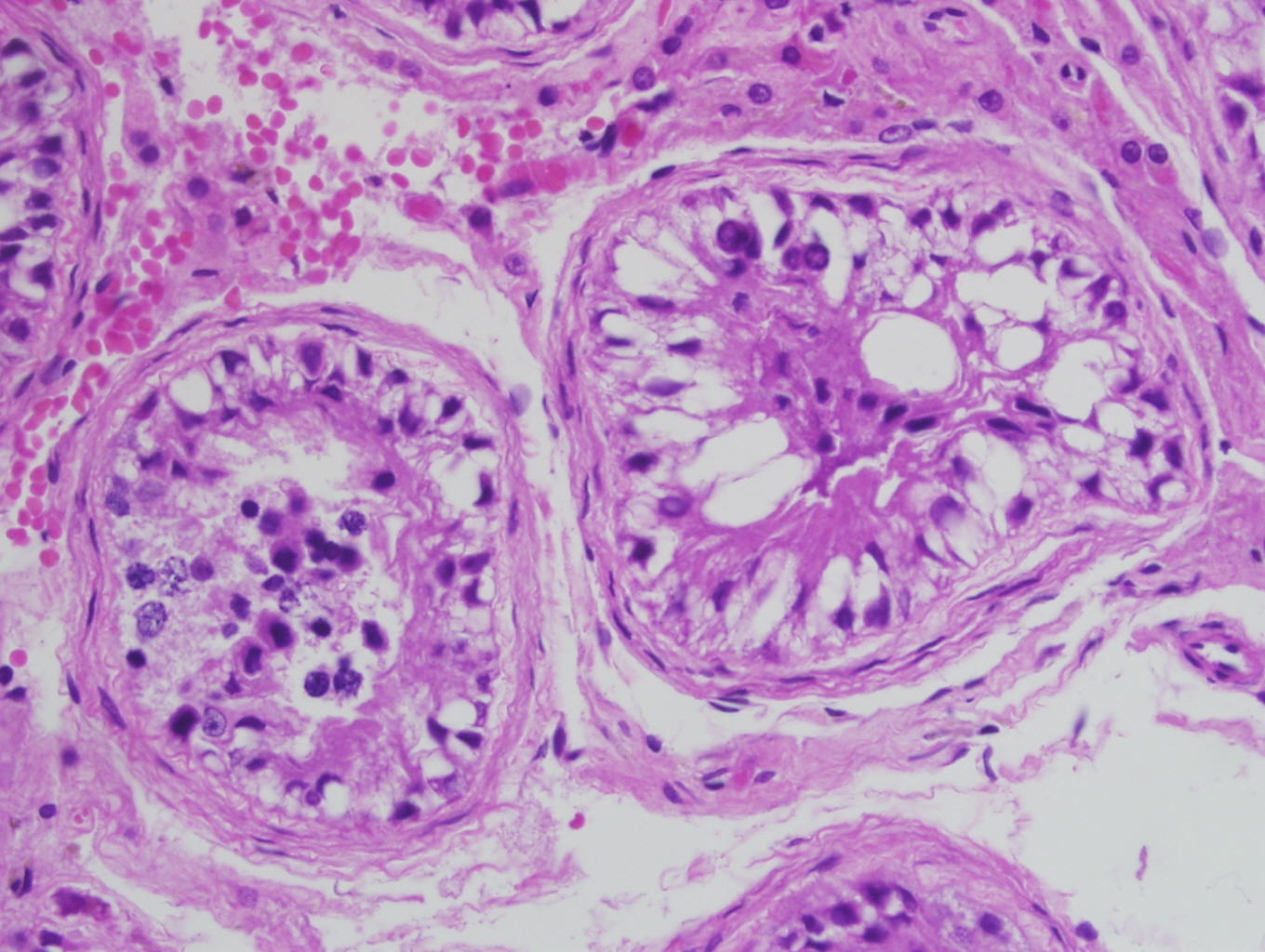
- Seminiferous tubules demonstrating maturation arrest.
- Specialty: Endocrinology, andrology
- Symptoms: Infertility, azoospermia, testicular atrophy, high FSH levels.
- Causes: Y-chromosome microdeletions, chemical or toxin exposure, radiation therapy, or severe testicular injuries.
- Diagnostic method: Testicular biopsy.
- Differential diagnosis: Leydig cell hyperplasia, azoospermia, Klinefelter syndrome, end-stage testis failure, maturation arrest, and hypospermatogenesis.
- Treatment: Microscopic testicular sperm extraction or testicular sperm aspiration.
- Frequency: Rare.

Sertoli cell-only syndrome (SCOS), also known as germ cell aplasia, is defined by azoospermia where the testicular seminiferous tubules are lined solely with Sertoli cells. Sertoli cells contribute to the formation of the blood-testis barrier and aid in sperm generation. These cells respond to follicle-stimulating hormone, which is secreted by the hypothalamus and aids in spermatogenesis.

Men often learn they have Sertoli cell-only syndrome between the ages of 20 and 40 when they are checked for infertility and found to produce no sperm. Other signs and symptoms are uncommon, yet in some cases, an underlying cause of SCO syndrome, such as Klinefelter syndrome, may produce other symptoms.

Most cases of SCO syndrome are idiopathic, however, causes may include deletions of genetic material on Y-chromosome regions, particularly the azoospermia factor area. Other factors include chemical or toxin exposure, previous exposure to radiation therapy, and a history of severe trauma. A testicular biopsy confirms the diagnosis of SCO syndrome. Although there is no effective treatment at the moment, assisted reproductive technology may help some men with SCO syndrome reproduce.

== Signs and symptoms ==
Infertility is the most prevalent symptom of Sertoli-cell-only syndrome. Semen examination reveals azoospermia, with sperm density frequently falling to fewer than 1 million sperm per mL. When sperm density falls, the testes exhibit SCO syndrome and hypospermatogenesis. The testes in men with SCO syndrome are normally small to normal in size, with normal form and consistency; though, some patients may have significant atrophy of the testes. The majority of patients with Sertoli cell-only syndrome (up to 90%) have increased FSH levels, which are typically two to three times normal.

== Causes ==
Sertoli cell-only syndrome does not have a clear origin, however, several theories have been suggested. These include Y-chromosome microdeletions, notably in the azoospermia factor region, chemical or toxin exposure, radiation therapy, or severe testicular injuries. Recent evidence indicates a Y-chromosomal CDY1 deletion in Sertoli cell-only syndrome, and reverse transcription-polymerase chain reaction testing of the DAZ and CDY1 genes could potentially predict this condition as well as assess the possibility of finding any mature spermatozoa for fertility treatment.

== Pathophysiology ==
Sertoli cell-only syndrome is likely multifactorial, and is characterized by severely reduced or absent spermatogenesis; because of the presence of Sertoli cells alone lining the seminiferous tubules. A substantial subset of men with this uncommon syndrome have microdeletions in the Yq11 region of the Y chromosome, an area known as the AZF (azoospermia factor) region. In particular, sertoli cell only syndrome (SCO) correlates with AZFa microdeletions. It is possible to recognize two types of SCO: SCO type 1 shows total absence of spermatogonia because of an altered migration of primordial germ cells from yolk sac to gonadal ridges; SCO type 2 is instead due to a subsequent damage and shows the presence of rare spermatogonia in a minority of tubules.

== Diagnosis ==
Sertoli cell-only syndrome is usually initially assessed by conducting two separate semen analyses. Sertoli cell-only disease is frequently characterized by azoospermia which is the complete absence of sperm in semen. A tiny fraction of patients may still have measurable sperm levels.

About 90% of those with Sertoli cell-only syndrome have elevated FSH levels, usually two to three times the normal amount.

Testicular biopsy is the only way to confirm non-obstructive azoospermia and Sertoli cell-only syndrome.

== Treatment ==
Sertoli cell-only syndrome currently has no known cure or treatment. However, patients who have significantly low sperm counts and even no sperm may still be evaluated for assisted reproductive techniques. Microscopic testicular sperm extraction is a microsurgical procedure that extracts sperm straight from the patient's testes. It has a substantially greater sperm retrieval success rate than testicular sperm aspiration, which is performed using a simple needle stick but does not require a microscopic surgeon.

== Epidemiology ==
Sertoli cell-only syndrome is extremely rare in the general population. Infertility affects around 10% of US couples. Approximately 30% of these couples have a pure male factor as the underlying cause, whereas the remaining 20% have a male and female influence. Although specific data are difficult to get, SCO syndrome affects less than 5%-10% of the aforementioned infertile individuals.

== See also ==
- azoospermia
