= BOLL =

Protein-coding gene in humans

Identifiers
- Aliases: BOLL, BOULE, boule homolog, RNA binding protein
- External IDs: OMIM: 606165; MGI: 1922638; GeneCards: BOLL

Gene location (Human)
Chr.	Chromosome 2 (human)
Band	2q33.1	Start	197,726,879 bp
Band	2q33.1	End	197,786,762 bp

Gene location (Mouse)
Chr.	Chromosome 1 (mouse)
Band	1|1 C1.2	Start	55,287,817 bp
Band	1|1 C1.2	End	55,402,628 bp
RNA expression pattern
Bgee	Human / Mouse (ortholog); Top expressed in: left testis; right testis; sperm; buccal mucosa cell; testicle; muscle of thigh; tibialis anterior muscle; gonad; gastrocnemius muscle; skeletal muscle tissue / Top expressed in: spermatocyte; spermatid; seminiferous tubule; lumbar subsegment of spinal cord; embryo; embryo; ganglion of neuraxis; granulocyte; morula; thymus; More reference expression data
BioGPS	n/a
Gene ontology
Molecular function	translation activator activity; protein binding; RNA binding; nucleic acid binding; mRNA 3'-UTR binding; mRNA binding
Cellular component	cytoplasm
Biological process	multicellular organism development; cell differentiation; positive regulation of translational initiation; regulation of translation; spermatogenesis; meiosis; 3'-UTR-mediated mRNA stabilization; germ cell development
Sources:Amigo / QuickGO
Orthologs
Databases	NCBI: entry; OMA: entry
Species	Human	Mouse
Entrez	66037	75388
Ensembl	ENSG00000152430	ENSMUSG00000025977
UniProt	Q8N9W6	Q924M5
RefSeq (mRNA)	NM_001284358; NM_001284361; NM_001284362; NM_033030; NM_197970	NM_001113367; NM_029267; NM_001367887; NM_001368767; NM_001368768
RefSeq (protein)	NP_001271287; NP_001271290; NP_001271291; NP_149019; NP_932074	NP_001106838; NP_083543; NP_001354816; NP_001355696; NP_001355697
Location (UCSC)	Chr 2: 197.73 – 197.79 Mb	Chr 1: 55.29 – 55.4 Mb
PubMed search
- Wikidata
View/Edit Human	View/Edit Mouse

Protein boule-like is a protein that in humans is encoded by the BOLL gene.

== Function ==
This gene belongs to the DAZ gene family required for germ cell development. It encodes an RNA-binding protein which is more similar to Drosophila Boule than to human proteins encoded by genes DAZ (deleted in azoospermia) or DAZL (deleted in azoospermia-like). Loss of this gene function results in the absence of sperm in semen (azoospermia). Histological studies demonstrated that the primary defect is at the meiotic G_{2} / M transition in fruitfly but in mice the primary defect is postmeiotic at round spermatid stage. Multiple alternatively spliced transcript variants encoding distinct isoforms have been found for this gene.

The boule-like protein appears to be ubiquitously expressed in males of all animal species, except in the most primitive trichoplax.
