= David C. Page =

American biologist and corporate director (born 1956)

David Page
- Born: David C. Page; 1956 (age 69–70); Harrisburg, Pennsylvania, U.S.
- Education: Swarthmore College (BA); Harvard University (MD)
- Awards: MacArthur Prize Fellowship; Searle Scholar Award
- Scientific career
- Fields: Genetics
- Workplaces: Whitehead Institute; Massachusetts Institute of Technology
- Doctoral students: Bruce Lahn
- Website: wi.mit.edu/people/faculty/page

David C. Page (born 1956) is an American biologist who is a professor at the Massachusetts Institute of Technology (MIT). He was the director of the Whitehead Institute and a Howard Hughes Medical Institute (HHMI) investigator. He is best known for his work on mapping the Y-chromosome and on its evolution in mammals and expression during development.

== Education and early life ==
Page was born in Harrisburg, Pennsylvania, in 1956 and grew up in the rural outskirts of Pennsylvania Dutch country. The first of his family to go to college, Page attended Swarthmore College, where he graduated with a B.A. with highest honors in chemistry in 1978. During his final year at Swarthmore, Page attended class just one day a week and spent the rest of his time researching chromatin structure in the laboratory of molecular biologist Robert Simpson at the National Institutes of Health. In 1978, Page enrolled at Harvard Medical School and the Harvard-MIT Health Sciences Program, where he worked in the laboratories of David Botstein at MIT and Raymond White at the University of Massachusetts Medical School. In White's lab, Page worked on a project to develop a genetic linkage map of the human genome that would become a precursor to the Human Genome Project. The work relied on locating restriction fragment length polymorphisms (RFLP). The first RFLP that Page found was from a site of homology between the X chromosome and Y chromosome, a coincidence that would set the direction of his subsequent career.

Page finished his M.D. degree in the spring of 1984 and started his own lab as the first Whitehead Fellow at the Whitehead Institute for Biomedical Research researching the genetics of XX male syndrome, or de la Chapelle Syndrome. After Page won the MacArthur "Genius Grant" in 1986, Page was promoted to the faculty of the Whitehead Institute and the MIT Department of Biology in 1988. In 1990, Page was named a Howard Hughes Medical Institute Investigator, and in 2005 he was named as director of the Whitehead Institute.

== Research and career ==
Page has worked in several areas of genetics.

=== Mapping the Y chromosome ===
In his work on de la Chapelle Syndrome in 1986, Page collaborated with the geneticist who originally identified the first XX male, Albert de la Chapelle, and geneticist Jean Weissenbach to show that XX males carry a small piece of the Y chromosome.

In the following year, he reported that the gene ZFY induced the development of the testes, a finding which received a great deal of media attention since it putatively resolving a decade-long search for the sex-determining gene. In 1989, a British team of scientists led by Peter Goodfellow and Robin Lovell-Badge began to report that the testis-determining gene was not ZFY, which led Page to review his data. Page found that he had misinterpreted his data because one of the XY females in his study had a second deletion at the site which proved to be the location of the real sex-determining gene. Launching a second round of media attention, Nature published his findings together with a paper from the British group that identified the sex-determining gene, which they termed SRY.

Despite a belief among geneticists that the Y chromosome contained few genes other than the sex-determining gene, Page continued to map the Y chromosome. He had already published DNA-based deletion maps of the Y chromosome in 1986, and went on to develop comprehensive clone-based physical maps of the chromosome in 1992 and systematic catalogs of Y-linked genes in 1997. Page collaborated with a team at the Genome Institute at Washington University to make a complete map of the Y chromosome, which they achieved in 2003. To do so, Page and his colleagues developed a new sequencing technique, single-haplotype iterative mapping and sequencing (SHIMS), since mammalian sex chromosomes contain too many repetitive sequences to be sequenced by conventional approaches. The development of SHIMS allowed Page to identify long palindromic sequences on the long arm of the Y chromosome, which he would go on to show made the Y chromosome vulnerable to the deletions that cause spermatogenic failure (an inability to produce sperm). In 2012, Page characterized the most common genetic cause of spermatogenic failure, the deletion of the AZFc region of the Y chromosome. The lab also found that aberrant crossing over within the Y chromosome's palindromes underlies a wide range of disorders of sexual differentiation, including Turner syndrome.

=== Evolution of the Y chromosome ===
With the development of more detailed maps of the Y chromosome, in the mid-1990s Page began to find genetic evidence confirming the theory that both the X and Y chromosomes had evolved from autosomes, beginning with the 1996 discovery that a family of genes called DAZ (deleted in azoospermia) had been transposed from an autosome to the Y chromosome. In 1999, Page and his then-graduate student Bruce Lahn showed that the X and Y chromosomes had diverged in four steps, beginning 200-300 million years ago. Later cross-species comparisons would show that while ancestral genes on the Y chromosome initially underwent rapid decay, the remaining genes have remained stable for the last 25 million years, overturning the long-held view that the Y chromosome was going extinct. In a 2014 study, Page concluded that the conserved genes on the Y chromosome played an important role in male viability, since they were dosage-dependent genes with similar but not identical counterparts on the X chromosome that all have regulatory roles in transcription, translation, and protein stability. Because these genes are expressed throughout the body, Page further concluded that these genes give rise to differences in the biochemistry of male and female tissues.

In super-resolution studies of the sex chromosomes, Page has found evidence of an evolutionary "arms race" between the X and Y chromosomes for transmission to the next generation. In one study, Page found that human X and mouse Y chromosomes have converged, independently acquiring and amplifying gene families expressed in testicular germ cells. Another study found that the mouse Y chromosome had acquired and massively amplified genes homologous to the testis-expressed gene families on the mouse X chromosome.

=== The genetics of germ cells ===
Page used the mouse as a model to study the genetics of meiotic initiation, showing that retinoic acid (RA) is the key factor which induces meiosis, as well as identifying several important genes crucial to the meiotic initiation pathway, including Stra8 and DAZL. Page further discovered that the differentiation germ cells into gametocytes (oocytes in females or spermatocytes in males) does not depend on meiotic initiation, as commonly thought, showing that germ cells deficient in Stra8, a gene that activates the meiotic pathway, are still capable of growth and differentiation.

=== Awards and honors ===
His honors and awards include:

- 1986 MacArthur Prize Fellowship
- 1989 Searle Scholar Award
- 1997 Francis Amory Prize, American Academy of Arts and Sciences (for genetic studies of mammalian sex determination; prize shared with Peter Goodfellow and Robin Lovell-Badge)
- 2003 Curt Stern Award, American Society of Human Genetics (for outstanding scientific achievement in human genetics)
- 2005 Member, National Academy of Sciences
- 2007 Fellow, American Association for the Advancement of Science
- 2008 Member, National Academy of Medicine
- 2011 Fellow, American Academy of Arts and Sciences (Class Speaker, Biological Sciences)
