= PUM2 =

Protein-coding gene in the species Homo sapiens

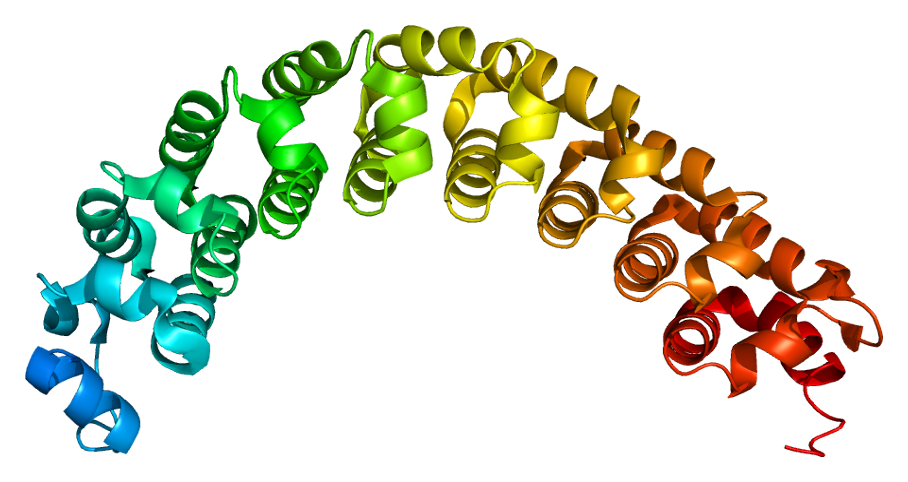

Identifiers
- Aliases: PUM2, PUMH2, PUML2, pumilio RNA binding family member 2
- External IDs: OMIM: 607205; MGI: 1931751; GeneCards: PUM2
Available structures
PDB	Ortholog search: PDBe RCSB
PDB	List of PDB id codes 3Q0Q, 3Q0R, 3Q0S

Gene location (Human)
Chr.	Chromosome 2 (human)
Band	2p24.1	Start	20,248,691 bp
Band	2p24.1	End	20,352,234 bp

Gene location (Mouse)
Chr.	Chromosome 12 (mouse)
Band	12|12 A1.1	Start	8,724,134 bp
Band	12|12 A1.1	End	8,802,581 bp
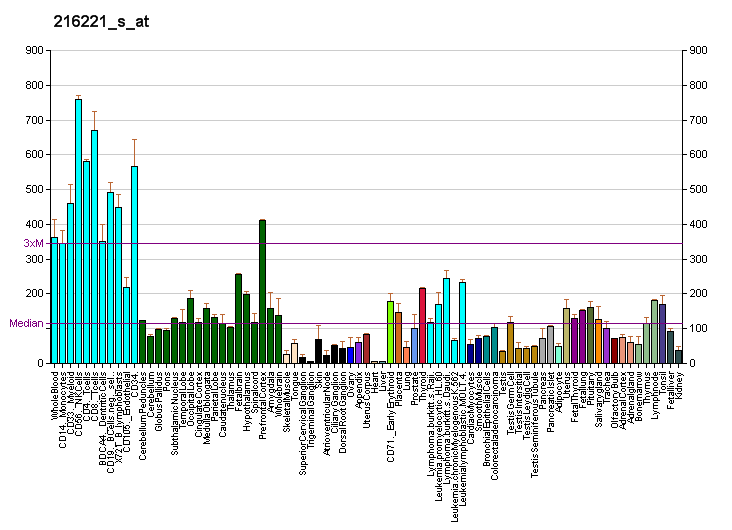

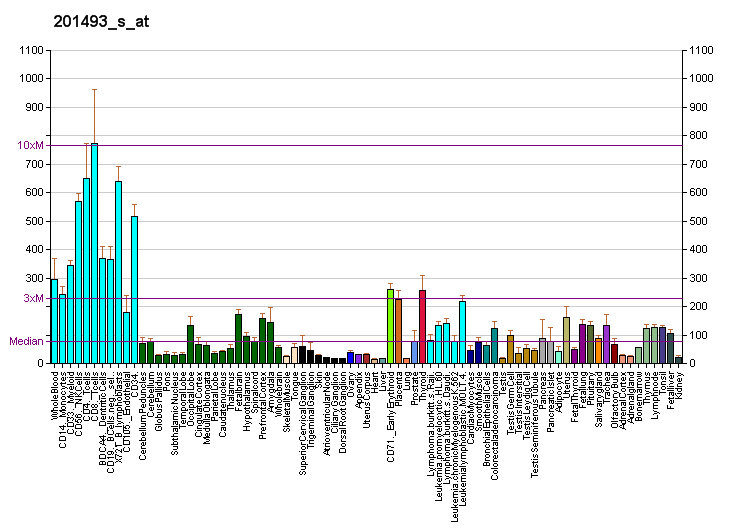
RNA expression pattern
Bgee	Human / Mouse (ortholog); Top expressed in: epithelium of colon; middle temporal gyrus; ventricular zone; tibia; Achilles tendon; skin of thigh; cerebellar vermis; epithelium of nasopharynx; ganglionic eminence; bronchial epithelial cell / Top expressed in: medial ganglionic eminence; Region I of hippocampus proper; human fetus; foot; cingulate gyrus; ciliary body; mesenteric lymph nodes; ventricular zone; entorhinal cortex; tail of embryo; More reference expression data
BioGPS	More reference expression data
Gene ontology
Molecular function	protein binding; RNA binding; mRNA 3'-UTR binding; miRNA binding
Cellular component	perinuclear region of cytoplasm; cytoplasmic stress granule; nuclear membrane; cytoplasm; cytosol
Biological process	regulation of chromosome segregation; regulation of gene silencing by miRNA; positive regulation of RIG-I signaling pathway; regulation of translation; regulation of mRNA stability; positive regulation of gene silencing by miRNA; stress granule assembly; posttranscriptional regulation of gene expression; production of miRNAs involved in gene silencing by miRNA
Sources:Amigo / QuickGO
Orthologs
Databases	NCBI: entry; OMA: entry
Species	Human	Mouse
Entrez	23369	80913
Ensembl	ENSG00000055917	ENSMUSG00000020594
UniProt	Q8TB72	Q80U58
RefSeq (mRNA)	NM_001282752; NM_001282790; NM_001282791; NM_015317; NM_001352917 NM_001352918; NM_001352919; NM_001352920; NM_001352923; NM_001352925; NM_001352926; NM_001352927; NM_001352928; NM_001352929; NM_001352930	NM_001160219; NM_001160220; NM_001160221; NM_001160222; NM_030723 NM_001310519
RefSeq (protein)	NP_001269681; NP_001269719; NP_001269720; NP_056132; NP_001339846 NP_001339847; NP_001339848; NP_001339849; NP_001339852; NP_001339854; NP_001339855; NP_001339856; NP_001339857; NP_001339858; NP_001339859	NP_001153691; NP_001153692; NP_001153693; NP_001153694; NP_001297448 NP_109648
Location (UCSC)	Chr 2: 20.25 – 20.35 Mb	Chr 12: 8.72 – 8.8 Mb
PubMed search
- Wikidata
View/Edit Human	View/Edit Mouse

Pumilio homolog 2 is an RNA-binding protein that in humans is encoded by the PUM2 gene.

== Interactions ==
PUM2 has been shown to interact with the following proteins:

- CPEB
- DAZL
- DAZ1
- NANOS1
