= Nitzan Mekel-Bobrov =

- Education: MS, Computer Science, University of Chicago; PhD, Genetics, Genomics and Systems Biology, University of Chicago
- Known for: Research on adaptive evolution of ASPM and Microcephalin
- Scientific career
- Fields: Computational genomics; Population genetics; Artificial intelligence
- Thesis: Genomic analysis and computational modeling of positive selection on human microcephaly genes (2007)
- Doctoral advisor: Bruce Lahn

Nitzan Mekel-Bobrov is an Israeli-American computational scientist and technology executive. He is known for research on the adaptive evolution of the human brain-size gene ASPM, published in Science in 2005. Since 2021, he has served as Chief AI Officer and Vice President of Technology Innovation at EBay, where he became the company's first Chief AI Officer.

== Early life and education ==
Mekel-Bobrov was born in Israel. He earned a PhD in Computational Genomics from the University of Chicago in 2006. His doctoral thesis was titled Genomic analysis and computational modeling of positive selection on human microcephaly genes, under his advisor was Bruce Lahn.

== Scientific research ==
Mekel-Bobrov's academic research examined genetic variation in human microcephaly genes including ASPM. His most cited work is 2005 Science article that reported evidence of recent positive selection in a variant of ASPM, a gene associated with modulating neural stem cell proliferation during human brain development. The study became one of the most widely discussed papers in human evolutionary genomics and contributed to broader scientific debate on the genetic basis of human cognitive evolution. The article was published alongside a related paper in Science co-authored by Mekel-Bobrov on Microcephalin, another gene associated with brain development.

In 2007, Mekel-Bobrov co-authored a follow-up study in Human Molecular Genetics examining whether recently derived variants of ASPM and Microcephalin were associated with measurable differences in intelligence. The authors reported that the ongoing adaptive evolution of the two genes was not explained by increased intelligence.

Mekel-Bobrov also authored theoretical and review articles on human brain development. These works synthesized emerging evidence from comparative genomics and population genetics to explore how genetic changes contributed to the evolution of the human nervous system.

Following his academic work in genomics, Mekel-Bobrov led and contributed to research in neuromodulation and cardiac rhythm management, bridging data science, and clinical medicine, while at Boston Scientific. He co-authored studies examining the use of multiple stimulation waveforms and neural targeting algorithms to deliver personalized therapeutics.

Mekel-Bobrov also participated in the development of quantitative methods for measuring chronic pain, including the Multiple Areas of Pain (MAP) study, which introduced an integrated index combining pain intensity, spatial distribution, and other dimensions of pain into a single quantitative measure. The work represented an early effort to apply large-scale analytics and predictive modeling to the assessment and treatment of chronic pain.

== Career ==
After leaving academic research, Mekel-Bobrov worked in data science and artificial intelligence roles across healthcare, financial services, online travel and e-commerce.

Mekel-Bobrov joined Boston Scientific in 2008, where he founded and led Boston Scientific's Center for Data Science. He joined Capital One in 2016, where he held leadership positions in artificial intelligence and enterprise data.

Mekel-Bobrov joined eBay in 2021 as the company's first Chief AI Officer. The position developed from eBay's chief scientist role and reflected the company's increased emphasis on artificial intelligence. At eBay, he has worked on artificial intelligence applications for search, product listings, seller tools, internal productivity and shopping recommendations. During his tenure, eBay expanded its use of generative artificial intelligence in customer- and seller-facing products, including AI-assisted listing tools and conversational shopping experiences. He has also been involved in the development of the company's AI governance and workforce AI adoption programs.

== Selected publications ==
- Ongoing Adaptive Evolution of ASPM, a Brain Size Determinant in Homo sapiens. Science. 309 (5741): 1720–1722. doi:10.1126/science.1116815. Mekel-Bobrov, Nitzan; Gilbert, S. L.; Evans, P. D.; Vallender, E. J.; Anderson, J. R.; Hudson, R. R.; Tishkoff, S. A.; Lahn, B. T. (2005).
- The ongoing adaptive evolution of ASPM and Microcephalin is not explained by increased intelligence. Human Molecular Genetics. 16 (6): 600–608. doi:10.1093/hmg/ddl487. Mekel-Bobrov, Nitzan; Posthuma, Danielle; Gilbert, S. L.; et al. (2007).
