= USP9Y =

Protein-coding gene in the species Homo sapiens

Identifiers
- Aliases: USP9Y, DFFRY, SPGFY2, ubiquitin specific peptidase 9, Y-linked, ubiquitin specific peptidase 9 Y-linked
- External IDs: OMIM: 400005; MGI: 1313274; GeneCards: USP9Y
Enzyme activity
EC #	BRENDA	ExPASy	KEGG	MetaCyc
3.4.19.12	↗	↗	↗	↗

Gene location (Human)
Chr.	Y chromosome (human)
Band	Yq11.221	Start	12,537,650 bp
Band	Yq11.221	End	12,860,839 bp

Gene location (Mouse)
Chr.	Y chromosome (mouse)
Band	Y|Ypter	Start	1,298,961 bp
Band	Y|Ypter	End	1,459,782 bp
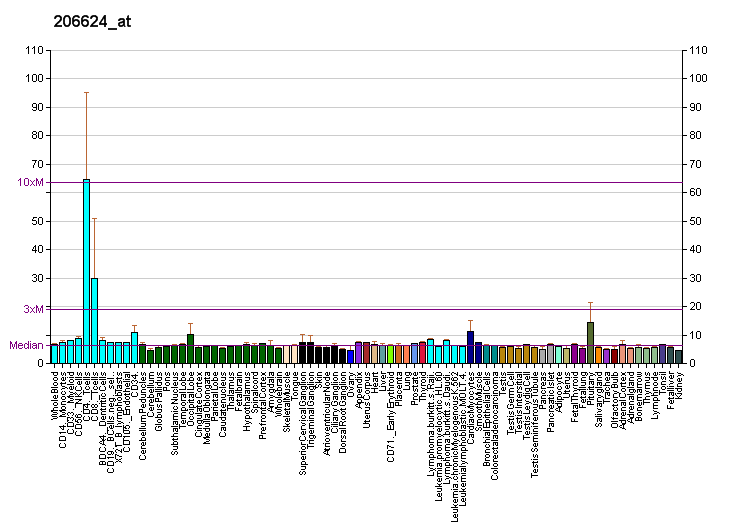
RNA expression pattern
Bgee	Human / Mouse (ortholog); Top expressed in: testicle; right lung; Brodmann area 9; prostate; gonad; skin of thigh; seminal vesicula; apex of heart; corpus epididymis; right hemisphere of cerebellum / Top expressed in: spermatid; embryo; seminiferous tubule; spermatocyte; Gonadal ridge; left lung lobe; trachea; More reference expression data
BioGPS	More reference expression data
Gene ontology
Molecular function	thiol-dependent deubiquitinase; peptidase activity; cysteine-type peptidase activity; co-SMAD binding; hydrolase activity; cysteine-type endopeptidase activity
Cellular component	cytoplasm
Biological process	protein deubiquitination; transforming growth factor beta receptor signaling pathway; cell migration; BMP signaling pathway; ubiquitin-dependent protein catabolic process; spermatogenesis; proteolysis
Sources:Amigo / QuickGO
Orthologs
Databases	NCBI: entry; OMA: entry
Species	Human	Mouse
Entrez	8287	107868
Ensembl	ENSG00000114374	ENSMUSG00000069044
UniProt	O00507	F8VPU6
RefSeq (mRNA)	NM_004654	NM_148943
RefSeq (protein)	NP_004645	NP_683745
Location (UCSC)	Chr Y: 12.54 – 12.86 Mb	Chr Y: 1.3 – 1.46 Mb
PubMed search
- Wikidata
View/Edit Human	View/Edit Mouse

Ubiquitin specific peptidase 9, Y-linked (fat facets-like, Drosophila), also known as USP9Y, is an enzyme which in humans is encoded by the USP9Y gene. It is required for sperm production. This enzyme is a member of the peptidase C19 family and is similar to ubiquitin-specific proteases, which cleave the ubiquitin moiety from ubiquitin-fused precursors and ubiquitinylated proteins.

== Clinical significance ==
Mutations in this gene have been associated with Sertoli cell-only syndrome (SCO) and male infertility.

The USP9Y gene is found on the azoospermia factor (AZF) region on the Y chromosome. Men who have impaired or no sperm production often have a deletion in the AZF region, especially in the USP9Y gene, and it was thought that USP9Y was necessary for sperm production. However, a man and his father with a USP9Y deletion who could produce sperm were recently reported. The corresponding gene is present but inactive in chimpanzees and bonobos.
