= Y chromosome microdeletion =

Family of genetic disorders caused by missing genes in the Y chromosome

Y chromosome microdeletion (YCM) is a family of genetic disorders caused by missing genes in the Y chromosome. Many men with YCM exhibit no symptoms and lead normal lives. It is present in a significant number of men with reduced fertility. Reduced sperm production varies from oligozoospermia, significant lack of sperm, or azoospermia, complete lack of sperm.

== Cause ==
The mechanism of mutation is not different for Y-chromosome microdeletion. However, the ability to repair it differs from other chromosomes. The human Y chromosome is passed directly from father to son, and is not protected against accumulating copying errors, whereas other chromosomes are error corrected by recombining genetic information from mother and father. This may leave natural selection as the primary repair mechanism for the Y chromosome.

== Diagnosis ==
Y chromosome microdeletion is currently diagnosed by extracting DNA from leukocytes in a man's blood sample, mixing it with some of the about 300 known genetic markers for sequence-tagged sites (STS) on the Y chromosome, and then using polymerase chain reaction amplification and gel electrophoresis in order to test whether the DNA sequence corresponding to the selected markers is present in the DNA.

Such procedures can test only the integrity of a tiny part of the overall 23 million base pair long Y chromosome. Therefore, the sensitivity of such tests depends on the choice and number of markers used. Present diagnostic techniques can only discover certain types of deletions and mutations on a chromosome and give therefore no complete picture of genetic causes of infertility. They can only demonstrate the presence of some defects, but not the absence of any possible genetic defect on the chromosome.

The preferred test for genetic mutation, namely complete DNA sequencing of a patient's Y chromosome, is too expensive for use in epidemiological research or clinical diagnostics.

In up to 20% of men with reduced sperm count, some form of YCM has been detected.

== Infertility ==
Microdeletions in the Y chromosome have been found at a much higher rate in infertile men than in fertile controls and the correlation found may still go up as improved genetic testing techniques for the Y chromosome are developed.

Much study has been focused upon the "azoospermia factor locus" (AZF), at Yq11. A specific partial deletion of AZFc called gr/gr deletion is significantly associated with male infertility among Caucasians in Europe and the Western Pacific region.

Additional genes associated with spermatogenesis in men and reduced fertility upon Y chromosome deletions include RBM, DAZ, SPGY, and TSPY.

== See also ==
- Infertility
- AZF1
