= Congenital absence of the vas deferens =

Birth defect of the male sex organ

- Specialty: Urology
- Causes: genetic mutations.

Congenital absence of the vas deferens (CAVD) is a condition in which the vasa deferentia reproductive organs fail to form properly prior to birth. It may either be unilateral (CUAVD) or bilateral (CBAVD).

== Signs and symptoms ==
The vas deferens connect the sperm-producing testicles to the penis. Therefore, those who are missing both vas deferens are typically able to create sperm but are unable to transport them appropriately. Their semen does not contain sperm, a condition known as azoospermia. Unilateral absence may not show any abnormalities in semen analysis.

Vas deferens are less commonly palpated during routine a physical examination, hence the absence may go unnoticed. Also, injury to Vas deferens common in surgery. Vas deferens may be absent on one or both sides, and in whole or in part. When only a part of Vas deferens is absent, it may fail to establish communication with the epididymis.

In one of the largest such studies, a study of 23,013 individuals seeking for vasectomy, 159 were suspected to be having UAVD. Among 159 men identified as potentially having CUAVD, 47 had only one testicle, 26 had bilateral vasa, and four were misdiagnosed (post-vasectomy semen analysis showing motile sperm after unilateral vasectomy) leaving 82 men deemed cases of CUAVD (0.36% of total sample). 82 men were further classified as confirmed (n=48, 0.21%) and possible (n=34, 0.15%; 22 without and 12 with scrotal anomalies) congenital UAVD. The misdiagnosis ratio of CUAVD was low when scrotal content was otherwise normal (1:48), but higher if anomalies were present (3:12).

== Causes ==
There are two main populations of CAVD; the larger group is associated with cystic fibrosis and occurs because of a mutation in the CFTR gene, while the smaller group (estimated between 10 and 40%) is associated with unilateral renal agenesis (URA). The mutational spectrum of CFTR in the first group differs from that observed in classic cystic fibrosis, with milder missense or splice variants present on at least one chromosome. The genetic basis of the second group is not well understood. In the subset of males with both CBAVD and URA, the CFTR mutation has been shown to occur at a rate only slightly higher than the overall population. It has been suggested that another gene may be responsible for this condition.

Mutation of the CFTR gene is found to result in obstructive azoospermia in postpubertal males with cystic fibrosis. Strikingly, CAVD is one of the most consistent features of cystic fibrosis as it affects 98-99% of individuals in this CF patient population. In contrast, acute or persistent respiratory symptoms present in only 51% of total CF patients.

== Diagnosis ==
Scrotal ultrasonography and transrectal ultrasonography (TRUS) are useful in detecting uni- or bilateral CAVD, which may be associated with visible abnormalities or agenesis of the epididymis, seminal vesicles or kidneys.

== Treatment ==
Individuals with CAVD can reproduce with the assistance of modern technology with a combination of testicular sperm extraction and intracytoplasmic sperm injection (ICSI). However, as the risk of either cystic fibrosis or renal agenesis is likely to be higher in the children, genetic counseling is generally recommended.
