= DAZ3 =

Protein-coding gene in the species Homo sapiens

Identifiers
- Aliases: DAZ3, pDP1679, deleted in azoospermia 3
- External IDs: OMIM: 400027; GeneCards: DAZ3

Gene location (Human)
Chr.	Y chromosome (human)
Band	Yq11.23	Start	24,763,069 bp
Band	Yq11.23	End	24,813,492 bp
RNA expression pattern
Bgee	Human / Mouse (ortholog); Top expressed in: gonad; fundus; body of stomach; male reproductive system; testicle / n/a; More reference expression data
BioGPS	n/a
Gene ontology
Molecular function	RNA binding; nucleic acid binding; translation activator activity; protein binding; mRNA binding; mRNA 3'-UTR binding
Cellular component	nucleus; cytoplasm; intracellular anatomical structure; protein-containing complex
Biological process	multicellular organism development; cell differentiation; spermatogenesis; positive regulation of translational initiation; 3'-UTR-mediated mRNA stabilization; germ cell development
Sources:Amigo / QuickGO
Orthologs
Databases	NCBI: entry; OMA: entry
Species	Human	Mouse
Entrez	57054	n/a
Ensembl	ENSG00000187191	n/a
UniProt	Q9NR90	n/a
RefSeq (mRNA)	NM_020364	n/a
RefSeq (protein)	NP_065097	n/a
Location (UCSC)	Chr Y: 24.76 – 24.81 Mb	n/a
PubMed search		n/a
- Wikidata
View/Edit Human

Deleted in azoospermia protein 3 is a protein that in humans is encoded by the DAZ3 gene.

This gene is a member of the DAZ gene family and is a candidate for the human Y-chromosomal azoospermia factor (AZF). Its expression is restricted to premeiotic germ cells, particularly in spermatogonia. It encodes an RNA-binding protein that is important for spermatogenesis. Four copies of this gene are found on chromosome Y within palindromic duplications; one pair of genes is part of the P2 palindrome and the second pair is part of the P1 palindrome. Each gene contains a 2.4 kb repeat including a 72-bp exon, called the DAZ repeat; the number of DAZ repeats is variable and there are several variations in the sequence of the DAZ repeat. Each copy of the gene also contains a 10.8 kb region that may be amplified; this region includes five exons that encode an RNA recognition motif (RRM) domain. This gene contains one copy of the 10.8 kb repeat.
