= NANOS1 =

Protein-coding gene in humans

Identifiers
- Aliases: NANOS1, NOS1, SPGF12, EC_Rep1a, NOS-1, nanos homolog 1 (Drosophila), ZC2HC12A, nanos C2HC-type zinc finger 1
- External IDs: OMIM: 608226; MGI: 2669254; GeneCards: NANOS1
Available structures
PDB	Ortholog search: PDBe RCSB
PDB	List of PDB id codes 4CQO

Gene location (Human)
Chr.	Chromosome 10 (human)
Band	10q26.11	Start	119,029,714 bp
Band	10q26.11	End	119,033,730 bp

Gene location (Mouse)
Chr.	Chromosome 19 (mouse)
Band	19|19 D3	Start	60,744,425 bp
Band	19|19 D3	End	60,748,352 bp
RNA expression pattern
Bgee	Human / Mouse (ortholog); Top expressed in: secondary oocyte; Skeletal muscle tissue of biceps brachii; vastus lateralis muscle; Skeletal muscle tissue of rectus abdominis; muscle of thigh; retinal pigment epithelium; gastrocnemius muscle; deltoid muscle; tibialis anterior muscle; left adrenal cortex / Top expressed in: Rostral migratory stream; zygote; supraoptic nucleus; secondary oocyte; nucleus accumbens; dorsal striatum; temporal lobe; granulocyte; superior frontal gyrus; primary oocyte; More reference expression data
BioGPS	n/a
Gene ontology
Molecular function	zinc ion binding; metal ion binding; translation repressor activity; RNA binding; protein binding
Cellular component	cytoplasm; perinuclear region of cytoplasm
Biological process	positive regulation of nuclear-transcribed mRNA catabolic process, deadenylation-dependent decay; regulation of translation; cell migration; epithelial cell migration; negative regulation of translation; posttranscriptional regulation of gene expression; cerebellar neuron development; tissue homeostasis; regulation of cell growth
Sources:Amigo / QuickGO
Orthologs
Databases	NCBI: entry; OMA: entry
Species	Human	Mouse
Entrez	340719	332397
Ensembl	ENSG00000188613	ENSMUSG00000072437
UniProt	Q8WY41	Q80WY3
RefSeq (mRNA)	NM_199461; NM_001009553	NM_178421
RefSeq (protein)	NP_955631	NP_848508
Location (UCSC)	Chr 10: 119.03 – 119.03 Mb	Chr 19: 60.74 – 60.75 Mb
PubMed search
- Wikidata
View/Edit Human	View/Edit Mouse

Nanos homolog 1 is a protein that in humans is encoded by the gene NANOS1. This is a zinc finger protein that may repress the translation of certain mRNAs as part of a complex with PUM2. Pathogenic mutations in NANOS1 have been associated with a male infertility disorder called Spermatogenic failure 12 (SPGF12).
