= Bruce Lahn =

American geneticist

- Born: 1969 (age 56–57); China
- Citizenship: United States
- Education: Harvard University; Massachusetts Institute of Technology
- Known for: MCPH1; Human Genetics; Human Evolutionary Genetics; Stem Cell Biology
- Scientific career
- Fields: Human Evolutionary Genetics; Stem Cell Biology; Tissue Engineering
- Workplaces: University of Chicago
- Doctoral advisor: David C. Page
- Doctoral students: Nitzan Mekel-Bobrov

Bruce Lahn is a Chinese-born American geneticist. Lahn came to the U.S. from China to continue his education in the late 1980s. He is the William B. Graham professor of Human Genetics at the University of Chicago. He is also the founder of the Center for Stem Cell Biology and Tissue Engineering at Sun Yat-sen University in Guangzhou, China. Lahn currently serves as the chief scientist of VectorBuilder, Inc.

Lahn's honors include the Merrill Lynch Forum Global Innovation Award, the TR100 Award from Technology Review, the Burroughs Wellcome Career Award, and a Searle Scholarship. He was also named to the 40-Under-40 list by Crains Chicago Business. Lahn received his B.A. in General Biology from Harvard University and his Ph.D. from the Massachusetts Institute of Technology in the lab of David C. Page. From 2000 to 2012, Lahn was a Howard Hughes Medical Institute sponsored Investigator.

His previous research specialized in human genetics and evolutionary genetics, especially human sex chromosome evolution and the genetic basis that underlies the evolutionary expansion of the human brain. Lahn's current research interests include stem cell biology and epigenetics.

== Biography ==
Bruce Lahn is a Chinese-born American scientist. He is the founder and Chief Scientist of VectorBuilder, a global leader in gene delivery solutions. In the past he has studied human genetics and evolutionary genetics. His main objective with previous studies was to study the evolution of human sex chromosomes and the underlying basis for the growth of the human brain. Lahn is currently doing a wide spread of stem cell research as well as working with epigenetics. Lahn's previous research has led to the hypothesis that the Neanderthals contributed to evolution of the human brain's size. Lahn is currently working to contribute a better understanding of the widespread use of stem cells to the science world.

== Contributions to science ==
His research on the microcephaly-associated gene, MCPH1, led to the hypothesis that an archaic Homo sapiens lineage such as the Neanderthals might have contributed to the recent development of the human brain. His research also suggested that newly arisen variants of two brain size genes, ASPM and MCPH1, might have been favored by positive natural selection in recent human history. This research provoked controversy due to the finding that the positively selected variants of these genes had spread to higher frequencies in some parts of the world than in others (for ASPM, it is higher in Europe and surrounding regions than other parts of the world; for MCPH1, it is higher outside sub-Saharan Africa than inside). He has advocated the moral position that human genetic diversity should be embraced and celebrated as among humanity's great assets. Later studies did not find the ASPM and MCPH1 gene variants identified by Lahn to be associated with mental ability or cognition in modern populations, and the haplotype was not found in the individuals used to prepare the first draft of the Neanderthal genome.

Lahn is currently working on a variety of studies using stem cells. They range anywhere from looking at if the suicide gene can be modified with stem cells, to looking at stem cells as a potential source to treat testicular dysfunctions.
