= DAZ2 =

Protein-coding gene in the species Homo sapiens

Identifiers
- Aliases: DAZ2, pDP1678, deleted in azoospermia 2
- External IDs: OMIM: 400026; MGI: 1342328; GeneCards: DAZ2

Gene location (Human)
Chr.	Y chromosome (human)
Band	Yq11.223	Start	23,219,434 bp
Band	Yq11.223	End	23,291,356 bp

Gene location (Mouse)
Chr.	Chromosome 17 (mouse)
Band	17 C|17 25.86 cM	Start	50,586,423 bp
Band	17 C|17 25.86 cM	End	50,600,664 bp
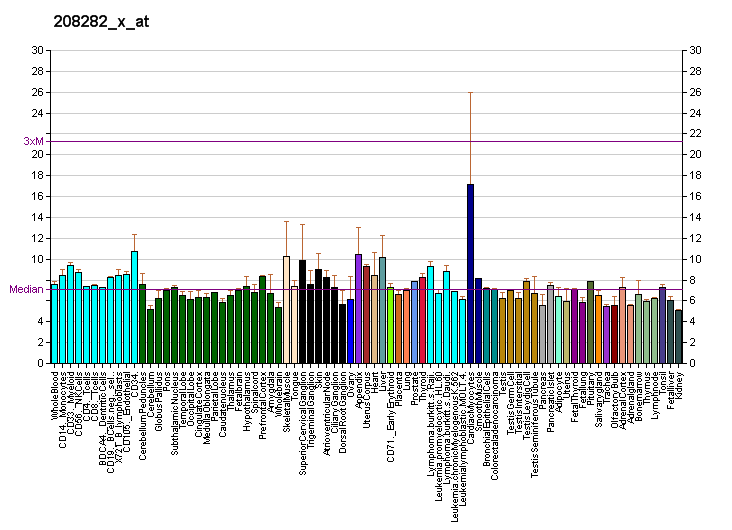
RNA expression pattern
Bgee	Human / Mouse (ortholog); Top expressed in: gonad; testicle; right testis; left testis; body of stomach; fundus; right lobe of liver; Achilles tendon; skin of abdomen; urinary bladder / Top expressed in: spermatocyte; spermatid; egg cell; Gonadal ridge; secondary oocyte; zygote; primary oocyte; seminiferous tubule; ovary; morula; More reference expression data
BioGPS	More reference expression data
Gene ontology
Molecular function	RNA binding; nucleic acid binding; translation activator activity; protein binding; mRNA binding; mRNA 3'-UTR binding
Cellular component	nucleus; cytoplasm; intracellular anatomical structure; protein-containing complex
Biological process	multicellular organism development; cell differentiation; spermatogenesis; single fertilization; positive regulation of translational initiation; 3'-UTR-mediated mRNA stabilization; germ cell development
Sources:Amigo / QuickGO
Orthologs
Databases	NCBI: entry; OMA: entry
Species	Human	Mouse
Entrez	57055	13164
Ensembl	ENSG00000205944	ENSMUSG00000010592
UniProt	Q13117	Q64368
RefSeq (mRNA)	NM_020363; NM_001005785; NM_001005786	NM_001277863; NM_010021
RefSeq (protein)	NP_001005785; NP_001005786; NP_065096	NP_001264792; NP_034151
Location (UCSC)	Chr Y: 23.22 – 23.29 Mb	Chr 17: 50.59 – 50.6 Mb
PubMed search
- Wikidata
View/Edit Human	View/Edit Mouse

Deleted in azoospermia protein 2 is a protein that in humans is encoded by the DAZ2 gene.

This gene is a member of the DAZ gene family and is a candidate for the human Y-chromosomal azoospermia factor (AZF). Its expression is restricted to premeiotic germ cells, particularly in spermatogonia. It encodes an RNA-binding protein that is important for spermatogenesis. Four copies of this gene are found on chromosome Y within palindromic duplications; one pair of genes is part of the P2 palindrome and the second pair is part of the P1 palindrome. Each gene contains a 2.4 kb repeat including a 72-bp exon, called the DAZ repeat; the number of DAZ repeats is variable and there are several variations in the sequence of the DAZ repeat. Each copy of the gene also contains a 10.8 kb region that may be amplified; this region includes five exons that encode an RNA recognition motif (RRM) domain. This gene contains one copy of the 10.8 kb repeat. Alternative splicing results in multiple transcript variants encoding different isoforms.
