= Testis expressed 15 =

Protein-coding gene in the species Homo sapiens

TEX15

Identifiers
- Aliases: TEX15, CT42, testis expressed 15, testis expressed 15, meiosis and synapsis associated, SPGF25
- External IDs: OMIM: 605795; MGI: 1934816; GeneCards: TEX15

Gene location (Human)
Chr.	Chromosome 8 (human)
Band	8p12	Start	30,831,544 bp
Band	8p12	End	30,913,008 bp

Gene location (Mouse)
Chr.	Chromosome 8 (mouse)
Band	8|8 A4	Start	34,006,766 bp
Band	8|8 A4	End	34,075,610 bp
RNA expression pattern
Bgee	Human / Mouse (ortholog); Top expressed in: testicle; sperm; secondary oocyte; gonad; right testis; left testis; body of uterus; smooth muscle tissue; ventricular zone; ganglionic eminence / Top expressed in: spermatid; lacrimal gland; parotid gland; cumulus cell; Gonadal ridge; seminiferous tubule; zygote; olfactory epithelium; secondary oocyte; primary oocyte; More reference expression data
BioGPS	n/a
Orthologs
Databases	NCBI: entry; OMA: entry
Species	Human	Mouse
Entrez	56154	104271
Ensembl	ENSG00000133863	ENSMUSG00000009628
UniProt	Q9BXT5	F8VPN2
RefSeq (mRNA)	NM_001350162	NM_031374
RefSeq (protein)	NP_001337091	NP_113551
Location (UCSC)	Chr 8: 30.83 – 30.91 Mb	Chr 8: 34.01 – 34.08 Mb
PubMed search
- Wikidata
View/Edit Human	View/Edit Mouse

Testis expressed 15 is a protein that in humans is encoded by the TEX15 gene.

The TEX15 gene displays testis-specific expression, maps to chromosome 8, contains four exons and encodes a 2789-amino acid protein. The TEX15 gene encodes a DNA damage response factor important in meiosis. TEX15 is also a nuclear effector of the mammalian piRNA pathway, required for silencing of transposable elements within the developing germline.

== Animal studies ==
In mice, disruption of an ortholog of the TEX15 gene caused a drastic reduction in testis size and meiotic arrest in males. TEX15, in mice, is required for chromosome synapsis, meiotic recombination and DNA double-strand break repair. Furthermore, TEX15 regulates the loading of recombination proteins (RAD51 and DMC1) onto sites of DNA double-strand breaks, and its absence causes a failure of meiotic recombination.

== Clinical significance ==
A mutation in the TEX15 gene was found to be associated with male infertility and meiotic maturation arrest.

Truncation variants of TEX15 are also potential breast cancer risk factors.
