= Microcephalin =

Protein-coding gene in the species Homo sapiens

MCPH1
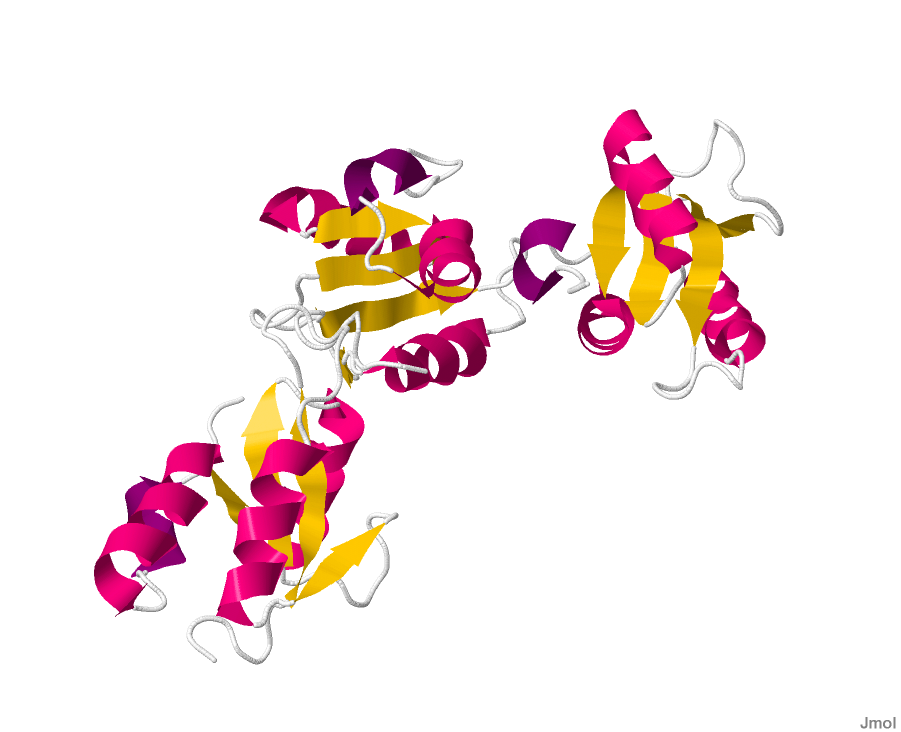

Identifiers
- Aliases: MCPH1, BRIT1, MCT, microcephalin 1
- External IDs: OMIM: 607117; MGI: 2443308; GeneCards: MCPH1
Available structures
PDB	Ortholog search: PDBe RCSB
PDB	List of PDB id codes 3T1N, 3SHT, 2WT8, 3SHV, 3U3Z, 3KTF, 3PA6, 3SZM

Gene location (Human)
Chr.	Chromosome 8 (human)
Band	8p23.1	Start	6,406,592 bp
Band	8p23.1	End	6,648,508 bp

Gene location (Mouse)
Chr.	Chromosome 8 (mouse)
Band	8|8 A1.3	Start	18,645,147 bp
Band	8|8 A1.3	End	18,853,205 bp
RNA expression pattern
Bgee	Human / Mouse (ortholog); Top expressed in: secondary oocyte; ganglionic eminence; Achilles tendon; ventricular zone; bone marrow cell; gastrocnemius muscle; muscle of thigh; popliteal artery; tibial arteries; testicle / Top expressed in: zygote; secondary oocyte; hand; tail of embryo; primary oocyte; genital tubercle; spermatocyte; primitive streak; epiblast; otic vesicle; More reference expression data
BioGPS	n/a
Gene ontology
Molecular function	protein binding; identical protein binding
Cellular component	cytoplasm; cytoskeleton; nucleoplasm; microtubule organizing center
Biological process	cerebral cortex development; establishment of mitotic spindle orientation; regulation of gene expression; regulation of kinase activity; regulation of centrosome cycle; regulation of inflammatory response; bone development; regulation of chromosome condensation; protein localization to centrosome; neuronal stem cell population maintenance; negative regulation of transcription by RNA polymerase II
Sources:Amigo / QuickGO
Orthologs
Databases	NCBI: entry; OMA: entry
Species	Human	Mouse
Entrez	79648	244329
Ensembl	ENSG00000147316; ENSG00000285262	ENSMUSG00000039842
UniProt	Q8NEM0	Q7TT79
RefSeq (mRNA)	NM_001172574; NM_001172575; NM_024596; NM_001322042; NM_001322043 NM_001322045; NM_001363979; NM_001363980	NM_173189
RefSeq (protein)	NP_001166045; NP_001166046; NP_001308971; NP_001308972; NP_001308974 NP_078872; NP_001350908; NP_001350909	NP_775281
Location (UCSC)	Chr 8: 6.41 – 6.65 Mb	Chr 8: 18.65 – 18.85 Mb
PubMed search
- Wikidata
View/Edit Human	View/Edit Mouse

Microcephalin protein
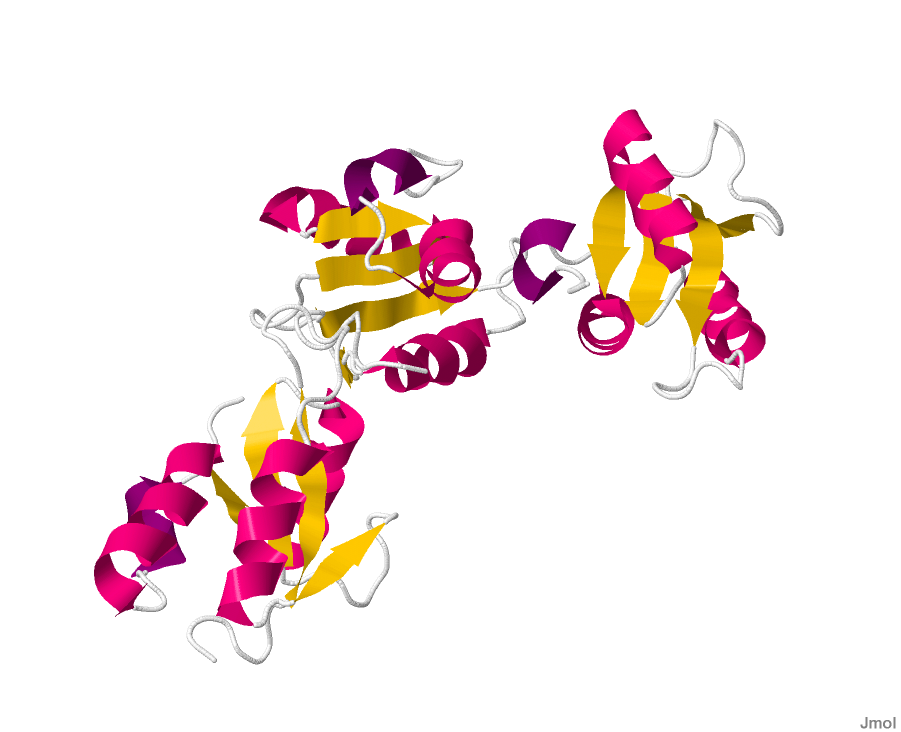
- Microcephalin.png

Identifiers
- Symbol: Microcephalin
- Pfam: PF12258
- InterPro: IPR022047
Available protein structures:
- PDB: IPR022047 PF12258 (ECOD; PDBsum)
- AlphaFold: IPR022047; PF12258

Microcephalin (MCPH1) is a gene that is expressed during fetal brain development. Certain mutations in MCPH1, when homozygous, cause primary microcephaly—a severely diminished brain. Hence, it has been assumed that variants have a role in brain development. However, in normal individuals no effect on mental ability or behavior has yet been demonstrated in either this or another similarly studied microcephaly gene, ASPM. However, an association has been established between normal variation in brain structure, as measured with MRI (i.e., primarily cortical surface area and total brain volume) but only in females, and common genetic variants within both the MCPH1 gene and another similarly studied microcephaly gene, CDK5RAP2.

== Structure ==
Microcephalin proteins contain the following three domains:

- N-terminal BRCT domain
- Central microcephalin protein domain (InterPro: IPR022047)
- C-terminal BRCT domain

== Expression in the brain ==
MCPH1 is expressed in the fetal brain, in the developing forebrain, and on the walls of the lateral ventricles. Cells of this area divide, producing neurons that migrate to eventually form the cerebral cortex.

== Evolution ==
A derived form of MCPH1 appeared about 37,000 years ago (any time between 14,000 and 60,000 years ago) and has spread to become the most common form of microcephalin throughout the world except Sub-Saharan Africa; this rapid spread suggests a selective sweep. However, scientists have not identified the evolutionary pressures that may have caused the spread of these mutations. This variant of the gene is thought to contribute to increased brain volume and may correlate with the incidence of tonal languages, though modern distributions of chromosomes bearing the ancestral forms of MCPH1 and ASPM showed neither microcephalin or ASPM had any significant effect on IQ.

The derived form of MCPH1 may have originated from a lineage separated from modern humans approximately 1.1 million years ago and later introgressed into humans. This finding supports the possibility of admixture between modern humans and extinct Homo spp. While Neanderthals have been suggested as the possible source of this haplotype, the haplotype was not found in the individuals used to prepare the first draft of the Neanderthal genome.

== Controversy ==
The research results began to attract considerable controversy in the science world. John Derbyshire wrote that as a result of the findings, "our cherished national dream of a well-mixed and harmonious meritocracy [...] may be unattainable." Richard Lewontin considers the two published papers as "egregious examples of going well beyond the data to try to make a splash." Bruce Lahn maintains that the science of the studies is sound, and freely admits that a direct link between these particular genes and either cognition or intelligence has not been clearly established. Lahn is now engaging himself with other areas of study. Later studies have not found those gene variants to be associated with mental ability or cognition.

Later genetic association studies by Mekel-Bobrov et al. and Evans et al. also reported that the genotype for MCPH1 was under positive selection. An analysis by Timpson et al., found "no meaningful associations with brain size and various cognitive measures". A later 2010 study by Rimol et al. demonstrated a link between brain size and structure and two microcephaly genes, MCPH1 (only in females) and CDK5RAP2 (only in males). In contrast to previous studies, which only considered small numbers of exonic single nucleotide polymorphisms (SNPs) and did not investigate sex-specific effects, this study used microarray technology to genotype a range of SNPs associated with all four MCPH genes, including upstream and downstream regulatory elements, and allowed for separate effects for males and females.

== Other MCPH genes ==
In addition to MCPH1, other genes have been designated MCPH genes based on their role in brain size. These include WDR62 (MCPH2), CDK5RAP2 (MCPH3), KNL1 (MCPH4), ASPM (MCPH5), CENPJ (MCPH6), STIL (MCPH7), CEP135 (MCPH8), CEP152 (MCPH9), ZNF335 (MCPH10), PHC1 (MCPH11) and CDK6 (MCPH12).

== Research studies ==
In March 2019, Chinese scientists reported inserting the human brain-related MCPH1 gene into laboratory rhesus monkeys, resulting in the transgenic monkeys performing better and answering faster on "short-term memory tests involving matching colors and shapes", compared to control non-transgenic monkeys, according to the researchers.

== See also ==
- Bruce Lahn
- Genetic determinism
- Race and genetics
- Race and intelligence
