= Testicular sperm extraction =

Surgical procedure

- Tissue is extracted from the seminiferous tubules during surgery in TESE
- Specialty: Reproductive medicine

Testicular sperm extraction (TESE) is a surgical procedure in which a small portion of tissue is removed from the testicle and any viable sperm cells from that tissue are extracted for use in further procedures, most commonly intracytoplasmic sperm injection (ICSI) as part of in vitro fertilisation (IVF). TESE is often recommended to patients who cannot produce sperm by ejaculation due to azoospermia.

== Medical uses ==
TESE is recommended to patients who do not have sperm present in their ejaculate, azoospermia, or who cannot ejaculate at all. In general, azoospermia can be divided into obstructive and non-obstructive subcategories.

TESE is primarily used for non-obstructive azoospermia, where patients do not have sperm present in the ejaculate but who may produce sperm in the testis. Azoospermia in these patients could be a result of Y chromosome microdeletions, cancer of the testicles or damage to the pituitary gland or hypothalamus, which regulate sperm production. Often in these cases, TESE is used as a second option, after prior efforts to treat the azoospermia through hormone therapy have failed.

However, if azoospermia is related to a disorder of sexual development, such as Klinefelter syndrome, TESE is not used clinically; as of 2016, this was in the research phase.

More rarely, TESE is used to extract sperm in cases of obstructive azoospermia. Obstructive azoospermia can be caused in a variety of ways:

- vasectomy
- trauma
- congenital absence of the vas deferens (CAVD)
- cystic fibrosis.

TESE can also be used as a fertility preservation option for patients undergoing gender reassignment surgery and who cannot ejaculate sperm.

== Technique ==
Conventional TESE is usually performed under local, or sometimes spinal or general, anaesthesia. An incision in the median raphe of the scrotum is made and continued through the dartos fibres and the tunica vaginalis. The testicle and epididymis are then visible. Incisions are then made through the outer covering of the testis to retrieve biopsies of seminiferous tubules, which are the structures that contain sperm. The incision is closed with sutures and each sample is assessed under a microscope to confirm the presence of sperm.

Following extraction, sperm is often cryogenically preserved for future use, but can also be used fresh.

=== Micro-TESE ===
Micro-TESE, or microdissection testicular sperm extraction, includes the use of an operating microscope. This allows the surgeon to observe regions of seminiferous tubules of the testes that have more chance of containing spermatozoa. The procedure is more invasive than conventional TESE, requiring general anaesthetic, and usually used only in patients with non-obstructive azoospermia. Similarly to TESE, an incision is made in the scrotum and surface of the testicle to expose seminiferous tubules. However, this exposure is much more wide in micro-TESE. This allows exploration of the incision under the microscope to identify areas of tubules more likely to contain more sperm. If none can be identified, biopsies are instead taken at random from a wide range of locations. The incision is closed with sutures. Samples are re-examined post-surgery to locate and then purify sperm.

When compared with FNA of the testis, conventional TESE is 2-fold more effective at identifying sperm in men with non-obstructive azoospermia. Compared with conventional TESE, micro-TESE has about 1.5-fold higher success in extracting sperm; as such, micro-TESE is preferable in cases of non-obstructive azoospermia, where infertility is caused by a lack of sperm production rather than a blockage. In these cases, micro-TESE is more likely to yield sufficient sperm for use in ICSI.

=== TESE vs TESA ===
TESE is different to testicular sperm aspiration (TESA). TESA is done under local anaesthesia, does not involve an open biopsy and is suitable for patients with obstructive azoospermia.

== Complications ==
Micro-TESE and TESE have risks of postoperative infection, bleeding and pain. TESE can result in testicular abnormalities and scarring of the tissue. The procedure can cause testicular fibrosis and inflammation, which can reduce testicular function and cause testicular atrophy. Both procedures can alter the steroid function of the testes causing a decline in serum testosterone levels, which can result in testosterone deficiency. This can cause side-effects including muscle weakness, decreased sexual function, anxiety, leading to sleep deficiency. The blood supply to the testis can also be altered during this procedure, potentially reducing supply. Long-term follow-ups are often recommended to prevent these complications.

Micro-TESE has limited postoperative complications compared with TESE. The use of the surgical microscope allows for small specific incisions to retrieve seminiferous tubules and evade damaging blood vessels by avoiding regions with no vasculature.

If TESE needs to be repeated due to insufficient sperm recovery, patients are usually advised to wait 6–12 months in order to allow adequate healing of the testis before further surgery.

== See also ==
- Azoospermia
- Intracytoplasmic sperm injection
- Percutaneous epididymal sperm aspiration
- Semen cryopreservation
