= DAZ protein family =

The DAZ (Deleted in AZoospermia) protein family is a group of three highly conserved RNA-binding proteins that are important in gametogenesis and meiosis. Therefore, mutations in the genes that encode for the DAZ proteins can have detrimental consequences for fertility.

The three members of the DAZ protein family include BOULE (BOLL), DAZL (DAZLA) and DAZ (DAZ1, DAZ2, DAZ3 and DAZ4). DAZ1 is located on the Y chromosome in higher primates and is important for spermatogenesis. BOULE and DAZL are important for both oogenesis and spermatogenesis. BOULE and DAZL are both located on autosomes as single copies. However DAZ is located with multiple copies in the Y chromosome only. BOULE is present from invertebrates, DAZL is from vertebrates and DAZ is present from primates.

== Discovery ==
Each DAZ protein family member was discovered individually, over a period of time by different research groups. BOULE was first identified in Drosophila, with homologs being found in other organisms, from sea anemone to humans, DAZL is thought to have come from BOULE by a gene duplication event and was first discovered in mice, but is present in all vertebrates, and the Y-chromosomal DAZ gene was first found in infertile males, but is also present in apes and Old World monkeys. DAZ arose during primate evolution by (i) transposition (moving) from the autosomal gene to the Y chromosome, (ii) removing unwanted parts of Exons within the transposed gene and (iii) amplification (making multiple copies) of the modified gene.

== Mechanism of action ==
The DAZ family of proteins have multiple mechanisms of action with varying regulatory effects on translation. The proteins exert their action on target mRNAs by binding various 3’-UTR sequences via their conserved RNA recognition motif. DAZL, which binds the GUU sequence of target mRNAs, interacts with poly(A)-binding proteins (PABPs) to initiate translation. PABPs consequently bind to the poly(A) tails of target mRNAs and cause the 5’ end to fold over, bringing it into close proximity with the 3’ end. This aids the recruitment of ribosomal units and hence the initiation of translation. This is an important function of DAZL as many mRNAs within germ cells have short pol(A)-tails and would therefore not be recruited for translation without the assistance of DAZL.

DAZ and DAZL also interact with the translationally repressive RNA Binding Protein PUM2 from the Pumilio RBP family. PUM2 interacts with both the conserved RRM and DAZ regions to form a complex which can interact other mRNAs to regulate their translation. Although the mechanism of this complex is not fully understood, it is thought that due to the inhibitory role of independent PUM2, the combination of both DAZ/DAZL and PUM2 will exert similar repressive effects.

== Family characteristics ==
DAZ family of proteins are mRNA translation regulators with a characteristic recognition motif for binding target mRNAs and a sequence of 24 amino acids that is characteristic to the family, named DAZ repeats. The characteristic structure of the protein family is a single RRM-like RNA-binding domain at the N-terminus (amino terminus) and amino acid repeats in the C-terminus (carboxy terminus). DAZ protein family is one of the few examples of a tissue-specific RNA-binding protein that acts as a developmental regulator. In mice and humans, DAZ protein is non-uniformly distributed in the cytoplasm of pre-meiotic germ cells due to its oligomerisation with itself. However, there are currently not relevant data for DAZL and BOULE. None of the family members is found in plants or fungi suggesting the DAZ family is an animal specific family of reproduction genes.

== Conservation among species ==
Expression of DAZ proteins varies between species but is mainly expressed in Primordial Germ Cells (PGCs). One DAZ homologue is expressed in nearly every stage of spermatogenesis, from PGCs to mature spermatozoa. The conservation of DAZ family genes among various species ranging from unicellular organisms to humans indicates their important role in fertility. More precisely, DAZ is only present in higher primates, without any homologues being present in unicellular organisms whereas BOULE is found in species ranging from sea anemones to humans and DAZL is conserved among vertebrates. BOULE was the first gene originating, while DAZ evolved from DAZL during primate evolution resulting in a 90% similarity in humans.

== Clinical significance ==
In humans, 50% of infertility issues are caused by males, and of this, genetic deletions in the Y chromosome make up a lot of this majority, since only men have the Y chromosome. DAZ gene in present on Y chromosome and deletion of this gene has been directly shown as a main cause of infertility. This causes no sperm cell found in semen and it is termed Azoospermia. One DAZ homologue is expressed in nearly every stage of spermatogenesis, from Primordial Germ Cells (PGCs) to mature spermatozoa.

DAZ is not absolutely required for spermatogenesis as some DAZ deleted men are still able to father children. DAZ pushes ESCs in to germ cells with molecular features of being spermatids.

DAZL is expressed in humans from early progenitor germ cell migration, right up to spermatozoa differentiation. Since DAZL is located on an autosome, it has been shown to be important in germ cell development of both oocyte and spermatocytes (in spermatogenesis and oogenesis), albeit in different expression patterns for both.
