= ASPM (gene) =

Mammalian protein found in humans

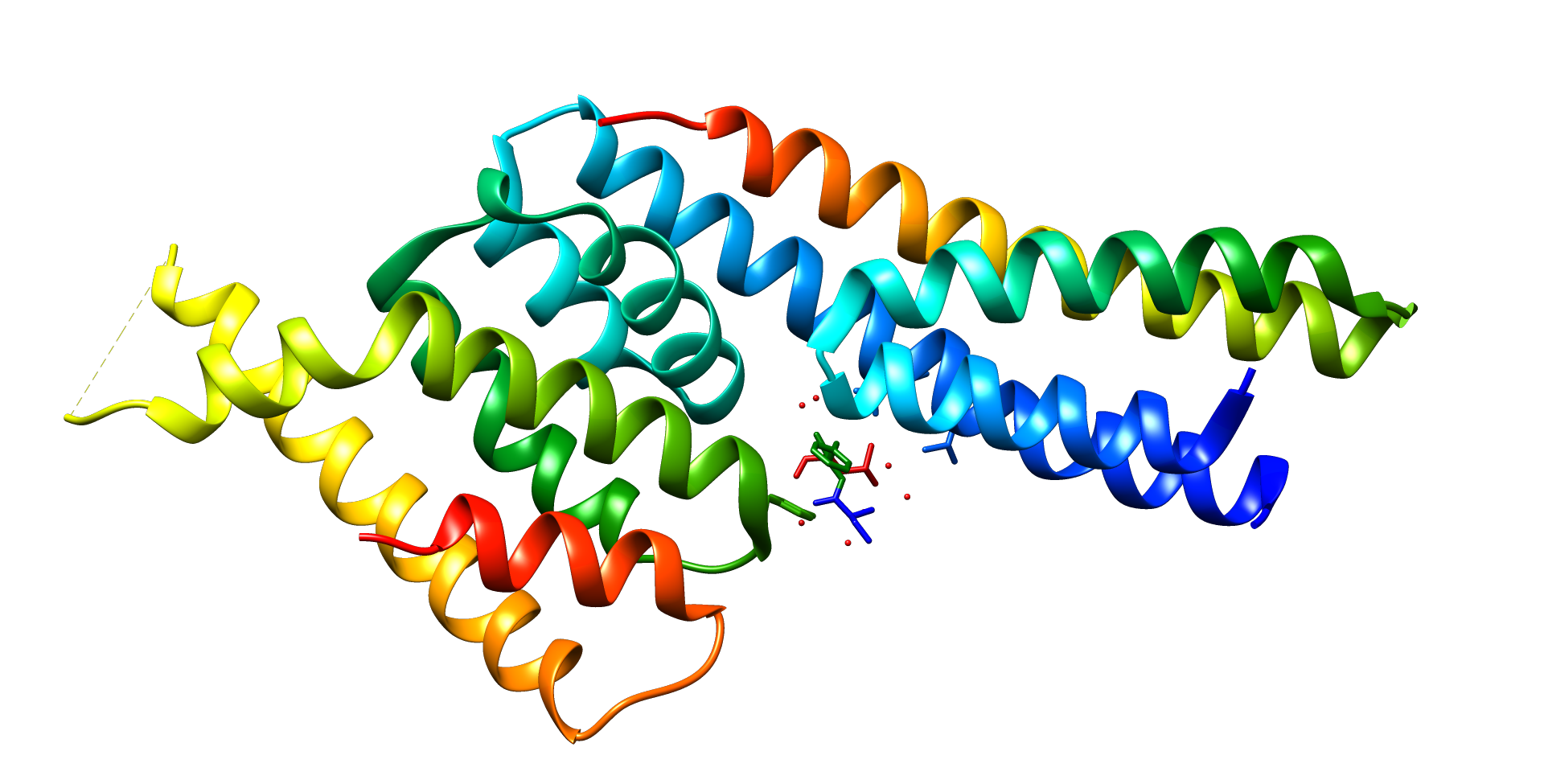

Identifiers
- Aliases: ASPM, ASP, Calmbp1, MCPH5, abnormal spindle microtubule assembly, assembly factor for spindle microtubules
- External IDs: OMIM: 605481; MGI: 1334448; GeneCards: ASPM
Available structures
PDB	Ortholog search: PDBe RCSB
PDB	List of PDB id codes 5LB7

Gene location (Human)
Chr.	Chromosome 1 (human)
Band	1q31.3	Start	197,084,121 bp
Band	1q31.3	End	197,146,694 bp

Gene location (Mouse)
Chr.	Chromosome 1 (mouse)
Band	1|1 F	Start	139,382,510 bp
Band	1|1 F	End	139,421,829 bp
RNA expression pattern
Bgee	Human / Mouse (ortholog); Top expressed in: oocyte; ventricular zone; secondary oocyte; trabecular bone; gonad; buccal mucosa cell; embryo; testicle; ganglionic eminence; bone marrow / Top expressed in: primary oocyte; zygote; secondary oocyte; genital tubercle; maxillary prominence; mandibular prominence; medial ganglionic eminence; vas deferens; atrium; condyle; More reference expression data
BioGPS	n/a
Gene ontology
Molecular function	calmodulin binding; protein kinase binding; protein binding
Cellular component	cytoplasm; mitotic spindle pole; spindle pole; meiotic spindle; spindle; midbody; microtubule; cytoskeleton; nucleus; microtubule minus-end; centrosome; apical plasma membrane
Biological process	positive regulation of neuroblast proliferation; maintenance of centrosome location; male gonad development; negative regulation of neuron differentiation; forebrain neuroblast division; positive regulation of canonical Wnt signaling pathway; regulation of meiotic cell cycle; neuron migration; oogenesis; neuronal stem cell population maintenance; cell division; brain development; spindle organization; developmental growth; spermatogenesis; negative regulation of asymmetric cell division; cerebral cortex development; cell cycle; spindle localization; meiotic spindle assembly
Sources:Amigo / QuickGO
Orthologs
Databases	NCBI: entry; OMA: entry
Species	Human	Mouse
Entrez	259266	12316
Ensembl	ENSG00000066279	ENSMUSG00000033952
UniProt	Q8IZT6	Q8CJ27
RefSeq (mRNA)	NM_018136; NM_001206846	NM_009791
RefSeq (protein)	NP_001193775; NP_060606	NP_033921
Location (UCSC)	Chr 1: 197.08 – 197.15 Mb	Chr 1: 139.38 – 139.42 Mb
PubMed search
- Wikidata
View/Edit Human	View/Edit Mouse

Abnormal spindle-like microcephaly-associated protein, also known as abnormal spindle protein homolog or Asp homolog, is a protein that in humans is encoded by the ASPM gene. ASPM is located on chromosome 1, band q31 (1q31). The ASPM gene contains 28 exons and codes for a 3477 amino-acid-long protein. The ASPM protein is conserved across species including human, mouse, Drosophila, and C. elegans. Defective forms of the ASPM gene are associated with autosomal recessive primary microcephaly.

"ASPM" is an acronym for "Abnormal Spindle-like, Microcephaly-associated", which reflects its being an ortholog to the Drosophila melanogaster "abnormal spindle" (asp) gene. The expressed protein product of the asp gene is essential for normal mitotic spindle function in embryonic neuroblasts and regulation of neurogenesis.

A new allele of ASPM arose sometime in the past 14,000 years (mean estimate 5,800 years), during the Holocene, it seems to have swept through much of the European and Middle-Eastern population. Although the new allele is evidently beneficial, researchers do not know what it does.

== Animal studies ==
The mouse gene, Aspm, is expressed in the primary sites of prenatal cerebral cortical neurogenesis. The difference between Aspm and ASPM is a single, large insertion coding for so-called IQ domains. Studies in mice also suggest a role of the expressed Aspm gene product in mitotic spindle regulation. The function is conserved, the C. elegans protein ASPM-1 was shown to be localized to spindle asters, where it regulates spindle organization and rotation by interacting with calmodulin, dynein and NuMA-related LIN-5.

One mouse study looking at medulloblastoma growth in mice to study the Aspm gene, an ortholog to human ASPM, suggests that Aspm expression may drive postnatal cerebellar neurogenesis. This process occurs late in embryogenesis and immediately after birth over a time span of about 2 weeks in mice and 12 months in humans, and is regulated by the expression of the Shh gene. In proliferating cerebellar granule neuron progenitors (CGNPs), Shh expression in mouse models showed four times the amount of Aspm expression than those deprived of Shh expression in-vivo. This induction of Aspm and up-regulation during cerebellar neurogenesis was also seen in real-time PCR, where its expression was relatively high at the peak of neurogenesis and much lower at the end of neurogenesis. Additionally, the study indicates that Aspm is necessary for cerebellar neurogenesis. In the presence of Aspm KO mutations and deletions, experimental mice models show decreased cerebellar volume under MRI, compared to the controls. In addition to mutated Aspm's effects on neurogenesis, these mutations may also play a role in neural differentiation. When looking at adult brains in Aspm KO mice, there was a trend in overall size reduction, and variations in cortical thickness between mutant and wild type models. In the somatosensory cortex, KO mice had a significantly thicker layer I cortex, thinner layer VI cortex, and an overall decrease in cortical thickness in the cortical plate. Certain transcription factors expressions were also abnormal in the KO mice. For example, Tbr1 and Satb2 had an increased presence in the cortical sub-plate, the first of which is important for differentiation and neuronal migration, and the second of which is a regulator of transcription and chromosomal remodeling.

While mouse studies have established the role of Aspm mutations in microcephaly, several have linked this mutation to other significant defects. One study showed nerve fiber impairments in which the shape and form of cortex and white matter tissue was altered. This was shown postnatally comparing KO mice and controls, where both cell number and cortical thickness was decreased in KO mice. Using a cell staining methodology for histological analysis, the study also showed shorter distances between adjacent neurons in KO mice, indicating abnormalities in cell alignment in the absence of normal Aspm.

Another significant impact of mutated Aspm is seen in germline abnormalities within mouse models. Mutations in Aspm were shown to reduce fertility in both female and male mice, indicated by a decrease in the rate of pregnancy and consequently the number of offspring, as well as a decrease in female ovarian size, as well as male sperm count and testicular size. The focus on severe germline mutations (as opposed to only mild microcephaly) in these mouse models raises the question as to whether or not human ASPM selection may be more significantly linked to reproduction than brain size. In addition to mouse models, a study using ferrets reveals more about ASPM and its role in determining cortical size and thickness. The researchers from this study chose ferrets over mouse models due to incongruencies between Aspm effects in mice versus ASPM effects in humans - humans with microcephaly due to this gene mutation tend to have significantly reduced brain sizes (about 50% reduction), whereas the analogous mutation in mice only results in mild brain size reduction. Ferrets also show more similarities to humans in terms of brain structure; ferrets' brains have gyrification in high amounts similar to humans, different from the relatively smooth brains of mice. As a result, there is less cortical surface area in mice compared to that of ferrets and humans. In this 2018 study, researchers targeted Aspm exon 15, where a mutation in humans is linked to severe cases of microcephaly. With a loss of function in Aspm, ferrets with Aspm mutations saw a 40% decrease in overall brain size coupled with no reduction in body size, similar to the effects of loss of ASPM in humans. The study also looked at the neurodevelopmental pathways and mechanisms leading to neurogenesis in the KO ferrets compared to the WT controls, specifically studying three different neuron progenitor cell (NPC) types, all of which express the mitotic marker Ki-67 and undergo radial glial migration to the cortical plate. They found that outer subventricular zone (OSVZ) NPCs were largely displaced, especially frontally and dorsally which mirrors the effects seen in cortical volume reductions due to ASPM KO.

== Human studies ==
Human primary microcephaly (MCPH) is a distinct subtype that is genetically inherited as an autosomal recessive trait. MCPH is characterized by a smaller cerebral cortex associated with mild to moderate intellectual disability and no other neurological deficits. Additionally, MCPH is associated with the absence of environmental causes such as intrauterine infections, exposure to prenatal radiation or drugs, maternal phenylketonuria, and birth asphyxia. MCPH has an incidence rate of 1/30,000 to 1/250,000 in western populations. To date, mutations in six loci and four genes associated with microcephaly have been discovered in humans. ASPM, one of these genes, is found at the MCPH5 locus. The most common cause of MCPH in humans is homozygous genetic mutation of the ASPM gene, orthologous to the Drosophila abnormal spindle gene (asp). In humans, the ASPM gene may play a strong role in the growth of the cerebral cortex. A total of 22 mutations have been discovered in the ASPM gene in individuals from Pakistan, Turkey, Yemen, Saudi Arabia, Jordan, and the Netherlands.

A study completed in Karnataka, South India by Kumar et al. analyzed the genetics of MCPH due to mutations in the ASPM gene. The study included nine families with blood relatives across many familial generations. Kumar et al. performed High-resolution G-banding chromosome analysis and haplotype analysis of individuals and families of those affected by MCPH. Kumar et al. found that the South Indian families affected by mutations in the MCPH5 locus did not share a common disease haplotype; thus the authors proposed that different mutations in the ASPM gene are responsible for MCPH.

A similar genetic study of MCPH in Pakistani families was done by Gul et al. in order to evaluate the relationship between ASPM gene mutations and microcephaly. The study was approved by the Institutional Review Board of Quaid-I-Azam University in Islamabad, Pakistan, and involved extraction of DNA and PCR techniques in order to genetically map the ASPM gene. Genotyping using microsatellite regions in the gene revealed that MCPH5 locus mutations were the most common cause of MCPH. Genotyping further linked mutations in the MCPH2 locus, MCPH4 locus, and the MCPH6 locus to microcephaly. Sequence analysis of ASPM in humans revealed four novel mutations; these four types of mutations are an insertion of four nucleotides (9118insCATT), a nonsense mutation (L3080X), a deletion of seven nucleotides (1260delTCAAGTC), and a missense mutation (Q3180P). Gul et al. found that parents who were heterozygous carriers for ASPM had normal cerebral circumferences and normal intelligence levels. The scientists were unable to identify mutations at the MCPH5 locus in nine families who had members affected by MCPH. They concluded that the mutations could be located in the regulatory sequences of ASPM, or that a gene other than ASPM located in the same region could be mutated.

The types of mutations causing MCPH in humans were expanded by a study done by Pichon et al. on an individual with primary microcephaly, as the study revealed a translocation breakpoint in the ASPM gene. Pichon et al. obtained BAC clones with BamHI digestion fragments of the "RP11-32D17" insert and used fluorescence in situ hybridization (FISH) in order to label the clones with fluorescein-12-dUTP. In order to precisely locate the translocation breakpoint, the BamHI digestion fragments of "RP11-32D17" were analyzed. The translocation breakpoint was located to be within intron 17 of the ASPM gene. The translocation resulted in a truncated ASPM protein, which is most likely a non-functioning protein also seen in truncating point mutations reported in MCPH patients.

== Evolution ==
A new allele (version) of ASPM appeared sometime within the last 14,100 years, with a mean estimate of 5,800 years ago. The new allele has a frequency of about 50% in populations of the Middle East and Europe, it is less frequent in East Asia, and has low frequencies among Sub-Saharan African populations. It is also found with an unusually high percentage among the people of Papua New Guinea, with a 59.4% occurrence.

The mean estimated age of the ASPM allele of 5,800 years ago roughly correlates with the development of written language, spread of agriculture and development of cities. Currently, two alleles of this gene exist: the older (pre-5,800 years ago) and the newer (post-5,800 years ago). About 10% of humans have two copies of the new ASPM allele, while about 50% have two copies of the old allele. The other 40% of humans have one copy of each. Of those with an instance of the new allele, 50% of them are an identical copy. The allele affects genotype over a large (62 kbp) region, a so called selective sweep which signals a rapid spread of a mutation (such as the new ASPM) through the population; this indicates that the mutation is somehow advantageous to the individual.

Testing the IQ of those with and without new ASPM allele has shown no difference in average IQ, providing no evidence to support the notion that the gene increases intelligence. Other genes related to brain development appear to have come under selective pressure in different populations. The DAB1 gene, involved in organizing cell layers in the cerebral cortex, shows evidence of a selective sweep in the Chinese. The SV2B gene, which encodes a synaptic vesicle protein, likewise shows evidence of a selective sweep in African Americans.

== See also ==
- Microcephalin
