= DAZAP2 =

Protein-coding gene in humans

Identifiers
- Aliases: DAZAP2, PRTB, DAZ associated protein 2
- External IDs: OMIM: 607431; MGI: 1344344; HomoloGene: 8038; GeneCards: DAZAP2; OMA:DAZAP2 - orthologs

Gene location (Human)
Chr.	Chromosome 12 (human)
Band	12q13.13	Start	51,238,724 bp
Band	12q13.13	End	51,271,362 bp

Gene location (Mouse)
Chr.	Chromosome 15 (mouse)
Band	15 F1|15 56.36 cM	Start	100,513,230 bp
Band	15 F1|15 56.36 cM	End	100,518,642 bp
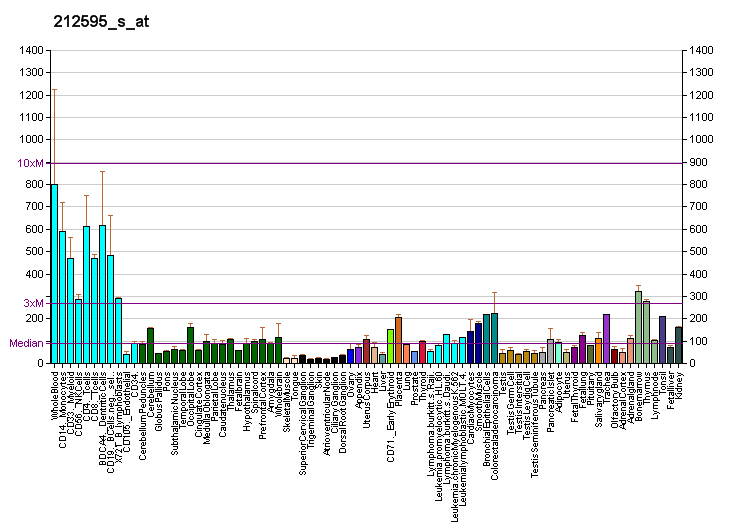

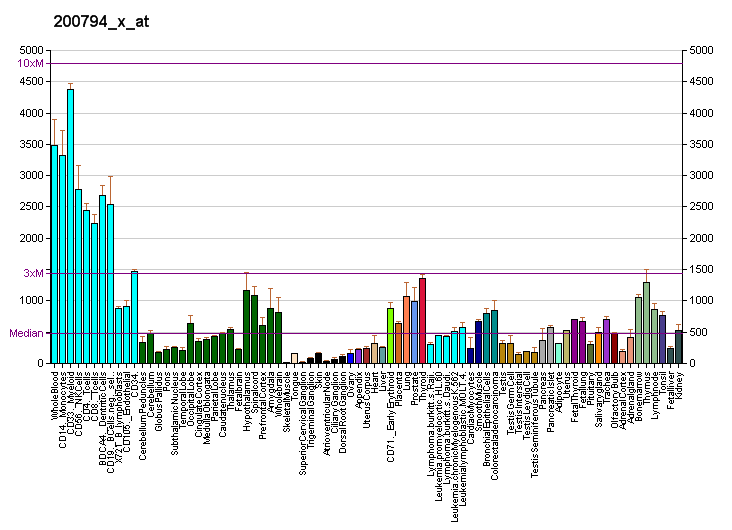

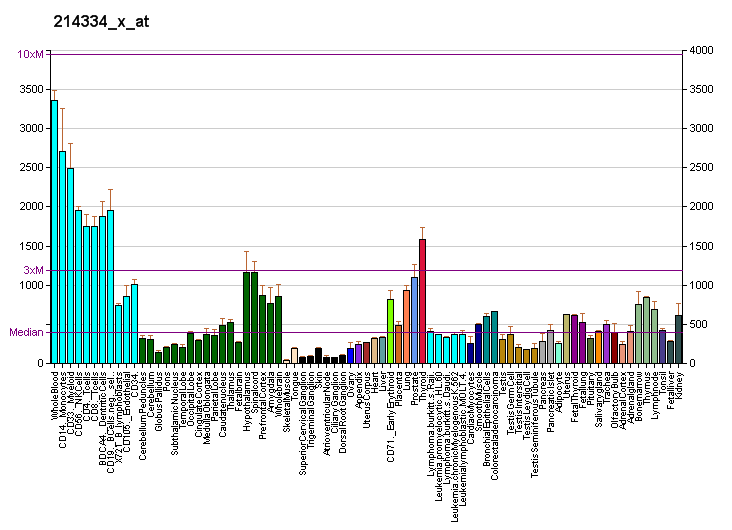
RNA expression pattern
Bgee	Human / Mouse (ortholog); Top expressed in: amniotic fluid; bronchial epithelial cell; endothelial cell; mucosa of sigmoid colon; epithelium of nasopharynx; monocyte; glomerulus; blood; metanephric glomerulus; germinal epithelium / Top expressed in: blood; right lung lobe; granulocyte; conjunctival fornix; stroma of bone marrow; skin of external ear; vestibular sensory epithelium; seminal vesicula; endothelial cell of lymphatic vessel; transitional epithelium of urinary bladder; More reference expression data
BioGPS	More reference expression data
Gene ontology
Molecular function	protein binding; WW domain binding; identical protein binding; receptor tyrosine kinase binding; mitogen-activated protein kinase kinase kinase binding; protein serine/threonine kinase activator activity
Cellular component	cytoplasm; nucleus; nuclear speck; protein-containing complex
Biological process	positive regulation of protein serine/threonine kinase activity
Sources:Amigo / QuickGO
Orthologs
Species	Human	Mouse
Entrez	9802	23994
Ensembl	ENSG00000183283	ENSMUSG00000000346
UniProt	Q15038	Q9DCP9
RefSeq (mRNA)	NM_014764; NM_001136264; NM_001136266; NM_001136267; NM_001136268 NM_001136269	NM_011873
RefSeq (protein)	NP_001129736; NP_001129738; NP_001129739; NP_001129740; NP_001129741 NP_055579	NP_036003
Location (UCSC)	Chr 12: 51.24 – 51.27 Mb	Chr 15: 100.51 – 100.52 Mb
PubMed search
- Wikidata
View/Edit Human	View/Edit Mouse

DAZ-associated protein 2 is a protein that in humans is encoded by the DAZAP2 gene.

== Function ==
In mammals, the Y chromosome directs the development of the testes and plays an important role in spermatogenesis. A high percentage of infertile men have deletions that map to regions of the Y chromosome. The DAZ (deleted in azoospermia) gene cluster maps to the AZFc region and is deleted in many azoospermic and severely oligospermic men. It is thought that the Y chromosomal DAZ gene cluster arose from the transposition, amplification, and pruning of the ancestral autosomal gene DAZL. This gene encodes a RNA-binding protein with two RNP motifs that was originally identified by its interaction with the infertility factors DAZ and DAZL.

== Interactions ==
DAZAP2 has been shown to interact with DAZ1.
