= DAZ1 =

Protein-coding gene in the species Homo sapiens

Identifiers
- Aliases: DAZ1, DAZ, SPGY, deleted in azoospermia 1
- External IDs: OMIM: 400003; GeneCards: DAZ1

Gene location (Human)
Chr.	Y chromosome (human)
Band	Yq11.223	Start	23,129,355 bp
Band	Yq11.223	End	23,199,010 bp
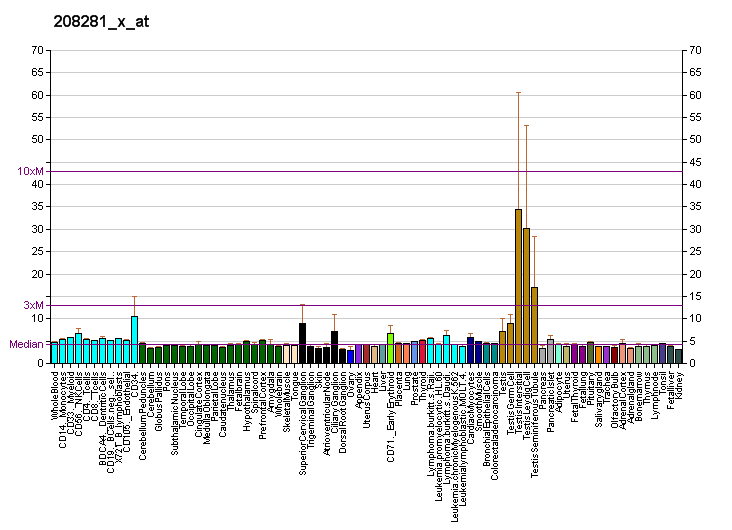

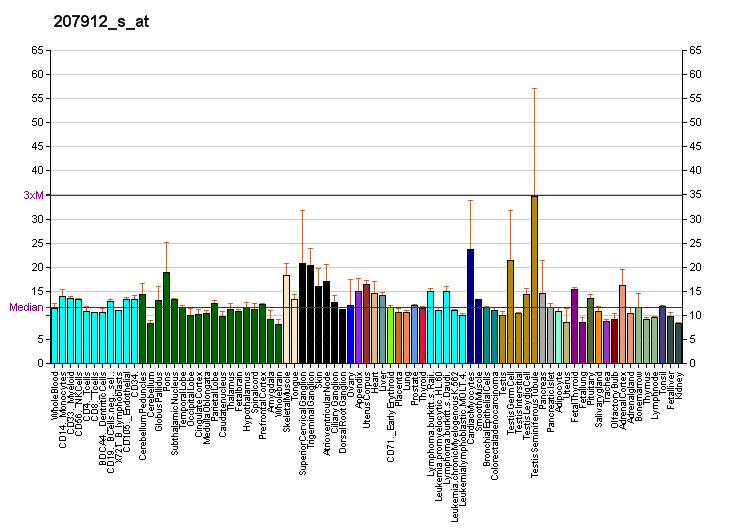
RNA expression pattern
Bgee	Human / Mouse (ortholog); Top expressed in: testicle; gonad; right testis; left testis; fundus; body of stomach; skin of abdomen; Achilles tendon; skin of leg; right lobe of liver / n/a; More reference expression data
BioGPS	More reference expression data
Gene ontology
Molecular function	translation activator activity; protein binding; RNA binding; nucleic acid binding; mRNA binding; mRNA 3'-UTR binding
Cellular component	nucleus; cytoplasm; intracellular anatomical structure; protein-containing complex
Biological process	multicellular organism development; cell differentiation; positive regulation of translational initiation; spermatogenesis; 3'-UTR-mediated mRNA stabilization; germ cell development
Sources:Amigo / QuickGO
Orthologs
Databases	NCBI: entry; OMA: entry
Species	Human	Mouse
Entrez	1617	n/a
Ensembl	ENSG00000188120	n/a
UniProt	Q9NQZ3	n/a
RefSeq (mRNA)	NM_004081; NM_001388496	n/a
RefSeq (protein)	NP_004072	n/a
Location (UCSC)	Chr Y: 23.13 – 23.2 Mb	n/a
PubMed search		n/a
- Wikidata
View/Edit Human

Deleted in azoospermia 1, also known as DAZ1, is a protein which in humans is encoded by the DAZ1 gene.

== Function ==
This gene is a member of the DAZ gene family and is a candidate for the human Y-chromosomal azoospermia factor (AZF). Its expression is restricted to pre-meiotic germ cells, particularly in spermatogonia. It encodes an RNA-binding protein that is important for spermatogenesis. Four copies of this gene are found on chromosome Y within palindromic duplications; one pair of genes is part of the P2 palindrome and the second pair is part of the P1 palindrome. Each gene contains a 2.4 kb repeat including a 72-bp exon, called the DAZ repeat; the number of DAZ repeats is variable and there are several variations in the sequence of the DAZ repeat. Each copy of the gene also contains a 10.8 kb region that may be amplified; this region includes five exons that encode an RNA recognition motif (RRM) domain. This gene contains three copies of the 10.8 kb repeat. However, no transcripts containing three copies of the RRM domain have been described; thus the RefSeq for this gene contains only two RRM domains.

== Interactions ==
DAZ1 has been shown to interact with DAZAP2, DAZL and DAZ associated protein 1.
