= DAZ associated protein 1 =

Protein-coding gene in the species Homo sapiens

DAZAP1
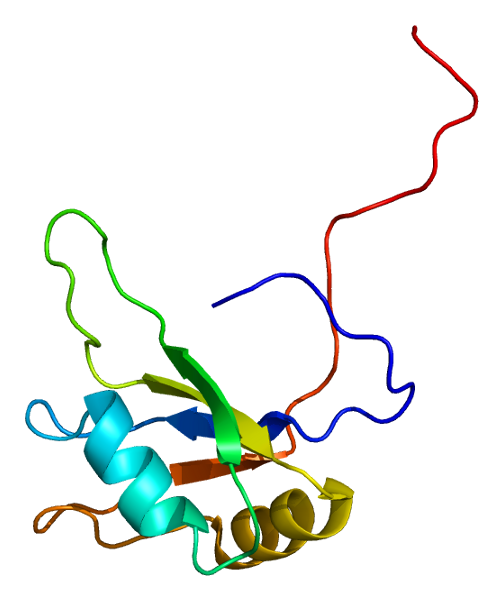

Identifiers
- Aliases: DAZAP1, DAZ associated protein 1
- External IDs: OMIM: 607430; MGI: 1917498; GeneCards: DAZAP1
Available structures
PDB	Ortholog search: PDBe RCSB
PDB	List of PDB id codes 2DGS, 2DH8

Gene location (Human)
Chr.	Chromosome 19 (human)
Band	19p13.3	Start	1,407,569 bp
Band	19p13.3	End	1,435,687 bp

Gene location (Mouse)
Chr.	Chromosome 10 (mouse)
Band	10|10 C1	Start	80,097,320 bp
Band	10|10 C1	End	80,124,242 bp
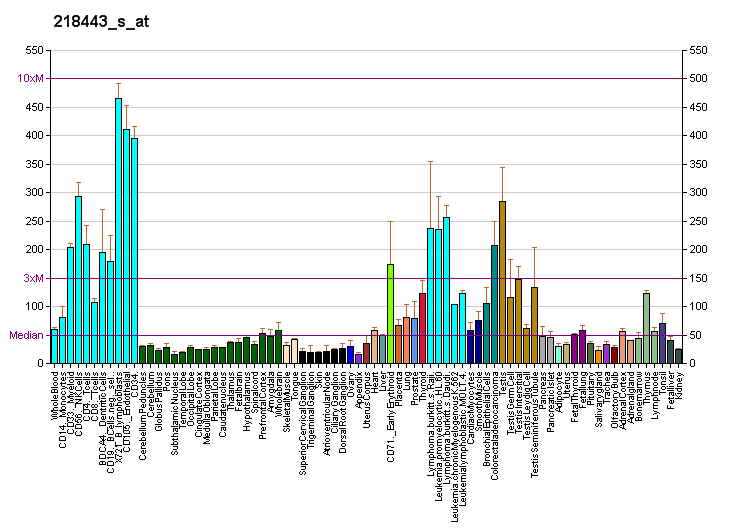
RNA expression pattern
Bgee	Human / Mouse (ortholog); Top expressed in: left testis; right testis; visceral pleura; mucosa of transverse colon; germinal epithelium; trabecular bone; olfactory zone of nasal mucosa; left ovary; granulocyte; right ovary / Top expressed in: neural layer of retina; yolk sac; spermatocyte; lip; ventricular zone; thymus; epiblast; renal corpuscle; ganglionic eminence; medullary collecting duct; More reference expression data
BioGPS	More reference expression data
Gene ontology
Molecular function	RNA stem-loop binding; nucleic acid binding; RNA binding; protein binding; poly(U) RNA binding; poly(G) binding; mRNA 3'-UTR binding; mRNA binding
Cellular component	nucleus; nucleoplasm; cytoplasm; cytosol; ribonucleoprotein complex; protein-containing complex
Biological process	multicellular organism development; maternal placenta development; cell population proliferation; cell differentiation; positive regulation of mRNA splicing, via spliceosome; spermatogenesis; germ cell development
Sources:Amigo / QuickGO
Orthologs
Databases	NCBI: entry; OMA: entry
Species	Human	Mouse
Entrez	26528	70248
Ensembl	ENSG00000071626	ENSMUSG00000069565
UniProt	Q96EP5	Q9JII5
RefSeq (mRNA)	NM_018959; NM_170711; NM_001352033; NM_001352034; NM_001352035	NM_001122604; NM_001122605; NM_133188; NM_001378995
RefSeq (protein)	NP_061832; NP_733829; NP_001338962; NP_001338963; NP_001338964	NP_001116076; NP_001116077; NP_573451; NP_001365924
Location (UCSC)	Chr 19: 1.41 – 1.44 Mb	Chr 10: 80.1 – 80.12 Mb
PubMed search
- Wikidata
View/Edit Human	View/Edit Mouse

DAZ-associated protein 1 is a protein that in humans is encoded by the DAZAP1 gene.

== Function ==
In mammals, the Y chromosome directs the development of the testes and plays an important role in spermatogenesis. A high percentage of infertile men have deletions that map to regions of the Y chromosome. The DAZ1 (Deleted in Azoospermia) gene cluster maps to the AZFc region of the Y chromosome and is deleted in many azoospermic and severely oligospermic men. It is thought that the DAZ gene cluster arose from the transposition, amplification, and pruning of the ancestral autosomal gene DAZL also involved in germ cell development and gametogenesis. This gene encodes an RNA-binding protein with two RNP motifs that was originally identified by its interaction with the infertility factors DAZ and DAZL. Two isoforms are encoded by transcript variants of this gene.

== Interactions ==
DAZ associated protein 1 has been shown to interact with DAZ1.
