= Azoospermia factor =

Protein

azoospermia factor 1

Identifiers
- Symbol: AZF1
- Alt. symbols: AZF
- NCBI gene: 560
- HGNC: 908

Other data
- Locus: Chr. Y q11

Azoospermia factor (AZF) is one of several proteins or their genes, which are coded from the AZF region on the human male Y chromosome. Deletions in this region are associated with inability to produce sperm. Subregions within the AZF region are AZFa (sometimes AZF1), AZFb and AZFc (together referred to as AZF2). AZF microdeletions are one of the major causes of male infertility for azoospermia (complete absence of sperm in the ejaculate) and severe oligozoospermia (less than 5 million spermatozoa in the ejaculate) males. AZF is the term used by the HUGO Gene Nomenclature Committee.

Of the 15% of couples who are affected by infertility, 50% of those cases are due to the male partner. 15-30% of male factor infertility cases can be correlated with genetic abnormalities. One of the most commonly identified genetic abnormalities in male factor infertility are microdeletions on the long arm of the Y chromosome (Yq), specifically at a region known as the azoospermic factor (AZF) region.

In certain circumstances, men with AZF mutations can turn to assisted reproductive technologies (ART), such as intracytoplasmic sperm injection (ICSI), to help them overcome their suboptimal sperm quality. However, it may be more important for clinicians to screen for Yq microdeletions, due to a growing body of evidence that AZF microdeletions have the capability to be vertically transmitted to male offspring. Minor et al. demonstrated that an AZFc mutation was vertically transmitted over three generations via fathers receiving reproductive assistance through ICSI.

== AZF1 / AZFa ==
The AZF1 (Azoospermia Factor 1) gene is likely located in the euchromatic part of the long arm in Yq11.23. AZF1 is 792kb long and just distal to the centromere of the Y chromosome. AZF1 genes are involved in spermatogenesis in the testes.

Common phenotypic manifestations of deletions in this region are azoospermia and Sertoli cell-only syndrome. Men with a complete deletion in the AZFa region are unable to produce testicular spermatozoa for ICSI. There are several candidate genes in the AZFa region that have been shown to cause infertility in males: Ubiquitin Specific Peptidase 9, Y-Linked (USP9Y), DEAD Box RNA helices, Box3, Y-linked (DBY), Ubiquitously Transcribed Tetratricopeptide Repeat Containing, Y-linked (UTY), and Thymosin Beta 4, Y-Linked (TB4Y).

== AZF2 ==
Originally, the AZFb and AZFc genes were identified and thought to be separate regions. They were later found to be overlapping and are sometimes referred to as AZF2.

=== AZFb ===
The AZFb subregion is located in the middle region of Yq11. Genes in this region have been found to support the growth and maturity of sperm and are critical for efficient progression of spermatogenesis. Common phenotypic manifestations of deletions in this region are spermatogenic arrest and azoospermia. There are multiple candidate genes in the AZFb region that have been shown to cause infertility in males: RNA Binding Motif Protein, Y-linked (RBMY), PTPN13-like, Y-linked (PRY), Chromosome Y Open Reading Frame 15 (CYorf15), Ribosomal Protein S4, Y-linked (RPS4Y1), Eukaryotic Translation Initiation Factor 1A, Y-linked (EIF1AY), Lysine Demethylase 5D (KDM5D), X Linked Kell Blood Group Precursor, Y-linked (XKRY), and Heat Shock Transcription Factor, Y-linked (HSFY).

=== AZFc ===
The AZFc subregion is located in the distal part of Yq11. Genes in this region have a diverse role, but overall, they are essential to complete spermatogenesis. AZFc deletions have been associated with drastic reduction in sperm count, and there are subsets of men with AZFc microdeletions that experience progressive declines in their sperm count. There are multiple candidate genes in the AZFc region that have been shown to cause infertility in males: Deleted in Azoospermia (DAZ), Chromodomain Protein, Y-linked (CDY), and Basic Protein, Y-linked, 2 (BPY2).

AZFc is one of the most genetically dynamic regions in the human genome, possibly serving as counter against the genetic degeneracy associated with the lack of a partner chromosome during meiosis. However, such strategy comes has the adverse effects that some rearrangements represent a risk factor or a de facto causative agent of spermatogenic disruption.

A specific partial deletion of AZFc called gr/gr deletion is significantly associated with male infertility among Caucasians in Europe and the Western Pacific region.

== Mutations ==
Mutations or deletions in the AZF genes are associated with inability or lessened ability to create sperm. It may cause azoospermia (not having any measurable level of sperm in semen). Deletions in the USP9Y gene, which is located within AZF1, are usually associated with inability to form sperm.

== See also ==
- USP9Y
