= DAZL =

Protein-coding gene in the species Homo sapiens

Identifiers
- Aliases: DAZL, DAZH, DAZL1, DAZLA, SPGYLA, deleted in azoospermia like
- External IDs: OMIM: 601486; MGI: 1342328; GeneCards: DAZL
Available structures
PDB	Ortholog search: PDBe RCSB
PDB	List of PDB id codes 2XS2, 2XS5, 2XS7, 2XSF

Gene location (Human)
Chr.	Chromosome 3 (human)
Band	3p24.3	Start	16,586,792 bp
Band	3p24.3	End	16,670,306 bp

Gene location (Mouse)
Chr.	Chromosome 17 (mouse)
Band	17 C|17 25.86 cM	Start	50,586,423 bp
Band	17 C|17 25.86 cM	End	50,600,664 bp
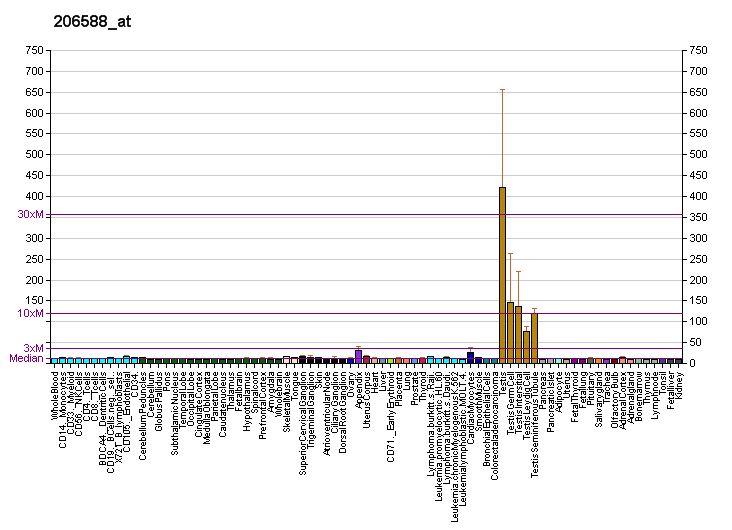
RNA expression pattern
Bgee	Human / Mouse (ortholog); Top expressed in: oocyte; secondary oocyte; gonad; right testis; left testis; sperm; testicle; appendix; metanephros; lymph node / Top expressed in: spermatocyte; spermatid; egg cell; Gonadal ridge; secondary oocyte; zygote; primary oocyte; seminiferous tubule; ovary; morula; More reference expression data
BioGPS	More reference expression data
Gene ontology
Molecular function	nucleic acid binding; protein binding; RNA binding; translation activator activity; identical protein binding; mRNA 3'-UTR binding; mRNA binding
Cellular component	nucleus; polysome; cytoplasm; intracellular anatomical structure; protein-containing complex
Biological process	multicellular organism development; cell differentiation; regulation of translation; spermatogenesis; oocyte maturation; female meiosis II; germ cell development; positive regulation of meiotic nuclear division; positive regulation of translational initiation; 3'-UTR-mediated mRNA stabilization
Sources:Amigo / QuickGO
Orthologs
Databases	NCBI: entry; OMA: entry
Species	Human	Mouse
Entrez	1618	13164
Ensembl	ENSG00000092345	ENSMUSG00000010592
UniProt	Q92904	Q64368
RefSeq (mRNA)	NM_001351; NM_001190811	NM_001277863; NM_010021
RefSeq (protein)	NP_001177740; NP_001342	NP_001264792; NP_034151
Location (UCSC)	Chr 3: 16.59 – 16.67 Mb	Chr 17: 50.59 – 50.6 Mb
PubMed search
- Wikidata
View/Edit Human	View/Edit Mouse

Deleted in azoospermia-like is a protein that in humans is encoded by the DAZL gene.

== Function ==
The DAZ (Deleted in AZoospermia) gene family encodes potential RNA binding proteins that are expressed in prenatal and postnatal germ cells of males and females. The protein encoded by this gene is localized to the nucleus and cytoplasm of fetal germ cells and to the cytoplasm of developing oocytes. In the testis, this protein is localized to the nucleus of spermatogonia but relocates to the cytoplasm during meiosis where it persists in spermatids and spermatozoa. Transposition and amplification of this autosomal gene during primate evolution gave rise to the DAZ gene cluster on the Y chromosome. Mutations in this gene have been linked to severe spermatogenic failure and infertility in males.

In mice and pigs deficient in DAZL, PGCs migrate to the gonad but do not undertake germ cell determination, and may instead produce germ cell tumors.

== Interactions ==
DAZL has been shown to interact with DAZ1.
