= Azoospermia =

Absence of sperm in the semen

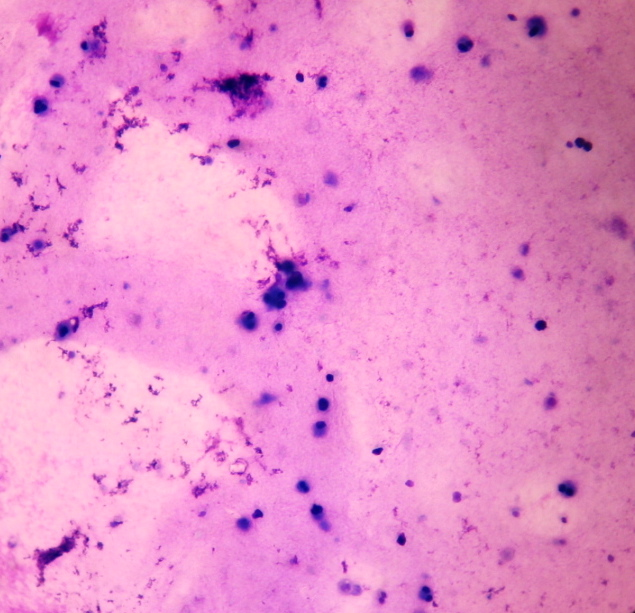
- Semen analysis revealing no sperm cells and multiple white blood cells
- Specialty: Urology

Azoospermia is the medical condition of a man whose semen contains no sperm. It is associated with male infertility, but many forms are amenable to medical treatment. In humans, azoospermia affects about 1% of the male population and may be seen in up to 20% of male infertility situations in Canada.

In a non-pathological context, azoospermia is also the intended result of a vasectomy.

== Classification ==
Azoospermia can be classified into three major types. Many conditions listed may also cause various degrees of oligospermia rather than azoospermia. Pretesticular and testicular azoospermia are known as non-obstructive azoospermia, whereas post-testicular azoospermia is considered obstructive.

=== Pretesticular ===
Inadequate stimulation of normal testicles and the genital tract characterizes pretesticular azoospermia. Typically, follicle-stimulating hormone (FSH) levels are low (hypogonadotropic), commensurate with inadequate stimulation of the testes to produce sperm. Examples include hypopituitarism (for various causes), hyperprolactinemia, and exogenous FSH suppression by testosterone. Chemotherapy may suppress spermatogenesis. Pretesticular azoospermia is seen in about 2% of azoospermia. Pretesticular azoospermia is a kind of non-obstructive azoospermia.

=== Testicular ===
Testicular azoospermia means the testes are abnormal, atrophic, or absent, and sperm production is severely disturbed or absent. FSH levels tend to be elevated (hypergonadotropic) as the feedback loop is interrupted (lack of feedback inhibition on FSH). The condition is seen in 49–93% of men with azoospermia. Testicular failure includes absence of sperm production and low production, and maturation arrest during the process of spermatogenesis.

Causes for testicular failure include congenital issues such as in certain genetic conditions (e.g. Klinefelter syndrome), some cases of cryptorchidism or Sertoli cell-only syndrome as well as acquired conditions by infection (orchitis), surgery (trauma, cancer), radiation, or other causes. Mast cells releasing inflammatory mediators appear to directly suppress sperm motility in a potentially reversible manner, and may be a common pathophysiological mechanism for many causes leading to inflammation. Testicular azoospermia is a kind of non-obstructive azoospermia.

Generally, men with unexplained hypergonadotropic azoospermia need to undergo a chromosomal evaluation.

=== Post-testicular ===
In post-testicular azoospermia, sperm are produced but not ejaculated, a condition that affects 7–51% of azoospermic men. The main cause is a physical obstruction (obstructive azoospermia) of the post-testicular genital tracts. The most common reason is a vasectomy done to induce contraceptive sterility. Other obstructions can be congenital (for example, agenesis of the vas deferens as seen in certain cases of cystic fibrosis) or acquired, such as ejaculatory duct obstruction for instance by infection.

Ejaculatory disorders include retrograde ejaculation and anejaculation; in these conditions sperm are produced but not expelled.

=== Unknown ===
Idiopathic azoospermia is where there is no known cause of the condition. It may be a result of multiple risk factors, such as age and weight. For example, a review in 2013 came to the result that oligospermia and azoospermia are significantly associated with being overweight (odds ratio 1.1), obese (odds ratio 1.3) and morbidly obese (odds ratio 2.0), but the cause of this is unknown. The review found no significant relation between oligospermia and being underweight.

== Genetics ==
Genetic factors can cause pretesticular, testicular, and post-testicular azoospermia (or oligospermia) and include the following situations: The frequency of chromosomal abnormalities is inversely proportional to the semen count, thus males with azoospermia are at risk to have a 10–15% (other sources citing 15–20% incidence) abnormalities on karyotyping versus about <1 % in the fertile male population.

Pretesticular azoospermia may be caused by congenital hypopituitarism, Kallmann syndrome, Prader-Willi syndrome, and other genetic conditions that lead to GnRH or gonadotropin deficiency. Testicular azoospermia is seen in Klinefelter syndrome (XXY) and the XX male syndrome. In addition, 13% of men with azoospermia have a defective spermatogenesis that is linked to defects of the Y chromosome. Such defects tend to be de novo micro-deletions and usually affect the long arm of the chromosome. A section of the long arm of the Y chromosome has been termed Azoospermia Factor (AZF) at Yq11 and subdivided into AZFa, AZFb, AZFc, and possibly more subsections. Defects in this area can lead to oligospermia or azoospermia, however, a tight genotype-phenotype correlation has not been achieved. Spermatogenesis is defective with gene defects for the androgen receptor.

Post-testicular azoospermia can be seen with certain point mutations in the cystic fibrosis transmembrane conductance regulator (CFTR) gene, commonly associated with congenital absence of the vas deferens.

Genetic counselling is indicated for men with genetic causes of azoospermia. Concerning reproduction, it needs to be considered if the genetic defect could be transmitted to the offspring.

=== BRD7 ===
BRD7, a transcription regulatory protein, is normally highly expressed in the testis. Absent or reduced expression of BRD7 protein was observed in the testes of azoospermia patients exhibiting spermatogenesis arrest. Homozygous knockout mice [BRD7(-/-)] are infertile and have higher levels of apoptosis and DNA damage in their germline cells.

=== Gene polymorphisms ===
The human breast cancer susceptibility gene 2 (BRCA2) is employed in DNA repair. A common single nucleotide polymorphism in BRCA2 is associated with idiopathic male infertility with azoospermia.

Four genes involved in DNA double-strand break repair and chromosome synapsis (TEX11, TEX15, MLH1 and MLH3) have key roles in genomic integrity, meiotic recombination and gametogenesis. Polymorphisms in these genes were tested for associations with male infertility. Single-nucleotide polymorphisms in two of these genes (TEX11 and MLH3) were found to be associated with male infertility involving azoospermy or oligospermia.

== Diagnosis ==
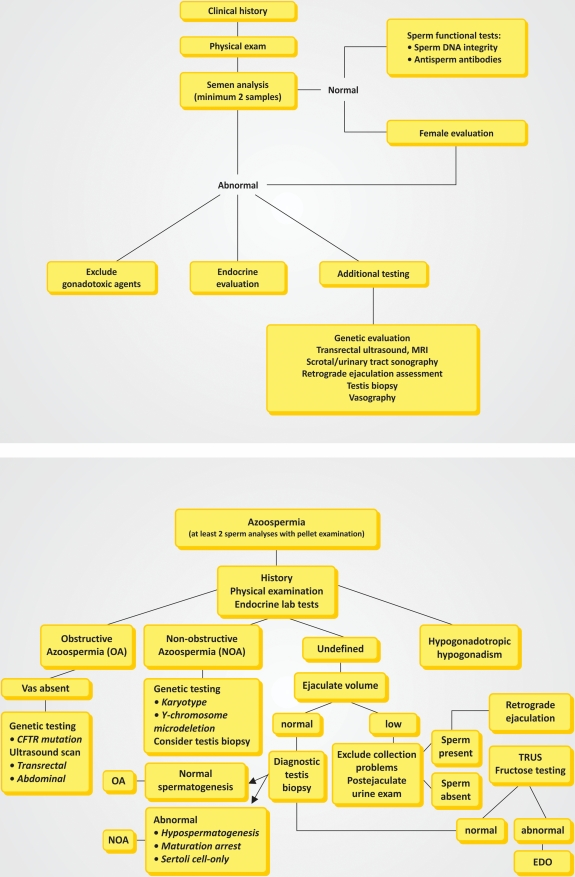
Algorithms for the workup of the infertile male. Algorithm to be considered on initial assessment (top). Algorithm for the management of the patient presenting with azoospermia (bottom).

Azoospermia is usually detected in the course of an infertility investigation. It is established based on two semen analysis evaluations done on separate occasions (when the seminal specimen, after centrifugation, shows no sperm under the microscope) and requires further work-up.

The investigation includes a history, a physical examination including a thorough evaluation of the scrotum and testes, laboratory tests, and possibly imaging. History includes the general health, sexual health, past fertility, libido, and sexual activity. Past exposure to several agents needs to be queried including medical agents like hormone/steroid therapy, SSRIs, antibiotics, 5-ASA inhibitors (sulfasalazine), alpha-blockers, 5-alpha-reductase inhibitors, chemotherapeutic agents, pesticides, recreational drugs (marijuana, alcohol), and heat exposure of the testes. A history of surgical procedures of the genital system needs to be elicited. The family history needs to be assessed to look for genetic abnormalities.

Congenital absence of the vas deferens may be detectable on physical examination and can be confirmed by a transrectal ultrasound (TRUS). If confirmed, genetic testing for cystic fibrosis is in order. Transrectal ultrasound can also assess azoospermia caused by obstruction, or anomalies related to obstruction of the ejaculatory duct, such as abnormalities within the duct itself, a median cyst of the prostate (indicating a need for cyst aspiration), or an impairment of the seminal vesicles to become enlarged or emptied. Retrograde ejaculation is diagnosed by examining a post-ejaculatory urine for the presence of sperm after making it alkaline and centrifuging it.

Low levels of LH and FSH with low or normal testosterone levels are indicative of pretesticular problems, while high levels of gonadotropins indicate testicular problems. However, often this distinction is unclear, and the differentiation between obstructive versus non-obstructive azoospermia may require a testicular biopsy. On the other hand, "In azoospermic men with a normal ejaculate volume, FSH serum level greater than two times the upper limit of the normal range is reliably diagnostic of dysfunctional spermatogenesis and, when found, a diagnostic testicular biopsy is usually unnecessary, although no consensus exists in this matter." Extremely high levels of FSH (>45 ID/mL) have been correlated with successful microdissection testicular sperm extraction.

Serum inhibin-B weakly indicates presence of sperm cells in the testes, raising chances for successfully achieving pregnancy through testicular sperm extraction (TESE), although the association is not very substantial, having a sensitivity of 0.65 (95% confidence interval [CI]: 0.56–0.74) and a specificity of 0.83 (CI: 0.64–0.93) for prediction the presence of sperm in the testes in non-obstructive azoospermia.

Seminal plasma proteins TEX101 and ECM1 were recently proposed for the differential diagnosis of azoospermia forms and subtypes, and for the prediction of TESE outcome. Mount Sinai Hospital, Canada, started a clinical trial to test this hypothesis in 2016.

Primary hypopituitarism may be linked to a genetic cause. So, a genetic evaluation may be done for men with azoospermia as a result. Azoospermic men with testicular failure are advised to undergo karyotype and Y-micro-deletion testing.

== Treatment ==
Pre- and post-testicular azoospermia are frequently correctable, while testicular azoospermia is usually permanent. In the former, the cause of the azoospermia needs to be considered, and it opens up possibilities to manage this situation directly. Thus, men with azoospermia due to hyperprolactinemia may resume sperm production after treatment of hyperprolactinemia, or men whose sperm production is suppressed by exogenous androgens are expected to produce sperm after cessation of androgen intake. In situations where the testes are normal but unstimulated, gonadotropin therapy can be expected to induce sperm production.

A major advancement in recent years has been the introduction of IVF with ICSI, which allows successful fertilization even with immature sperm or sperm obtained directly from testicular tissue. IVF-ICSI allows for pregnancy in couples where the man has irreversible testicular azoospermia as long as it is possible to recover sperm material from the testes. Thus, men with non-mosaic Klinefelter's syndrome have fathered children using IVF-ICSI. Pregnancies have been achieved in situations where azoospermia was associated with cryptorchidism and sperm were obtained by testicular sperm extraction (TESE).

In men with post-testicular azoospermia, different approaches are available. For obstructive azoospermia, IVF-ICSI or surgery can be used, and individual factors are considered for the choice of treatment. Medication may be helpful for retrograde ejaculation.

== See also ==
- DAZ protein family
