= C19Orf81 =

Human protein and gene

C19orf81

Identifiers
- Aliases: C19orf81, chromosome 19 open reading frame 81
- External IDs: MGI: 1916599; HomoloGene: 19260; GeneCards: C19orf81; OMA:C19orf81 - orthologs

Gene location (Human)
| Chr. | Chromosome 19 (human) |
| Band | 19q13.33 | Start | 50,649,445 bp |
| Band | 19q13.33 | End | 50,659,310 bp |

Gene location (Mouse)
| Chr. | Chromosome 7 (mouse) |
| Band | 7|7 B3 | Start | 44,009,467 bp |
| Band | 7|7 B3 | End | 44,035,244 bp |
RNA expression pattern
| Bgee | Human / Mouse (ortholog); Top expressed in: anterior pituitary; right hemisphere of cerebellum; pancreatic ductal cell; left testis; right testis; C1 segment; Brodmann area 9; stromal cell of endometrium; right uterine tube; right frontal lobe / Top expressed in: seminiferous tubule; spermatid; spermatocyte; embryo; embryo; epiblast; superior frontal gyrus; dentate gyrus of hippocampal formation granule cell; primary visual cortex; tail of embryo; More reference expression data |
| BioGPS | n/a |
Orthologs
| Species | Human | Mouse |
| Entrez | 342918 | 69349 |
| Ensembl | ENSG00000235034 | ENSMUSG00000008028 |
| UniProt | C9J6K1; H7BZS0 | D3Z070 |
| RefSeq (mRNA) | NM_001195076 | NM_027049 |
| RefSeq (protein) | NP_001182005 | NP_081325 |
| Location (UCSC) | Chr 19: 50.65 – 50.66 Mb | Chr 7: 44.01 – 44.04 Mb |
| PubMed search |
- Wikidata
| View/Edit Human | View/Edit Mouse |

C19Orf81 is a protein which in humans is encoded by the gene C19Orf81. It is a rarely expressed protein found mainly in the testes, cerebellum and cerebral cortex.

== Aliases ==
Other names for C19Orf81 include chromosome 19 open reading frame 81 and C9J6K1.

== Gene ==
The gene C19Orf81 is found on chromosome 19 at site 19q13.33 from and is 9862 base pairs in length. It runs in the positive direction. 5 exons compose the 761 base pair (bp) coding sequence of the gene. One isoform gene exists for C19Orf81 that is 951 bp in length (XM_054320844.1).

=== mRNA expression ===
Tissue expression of C19Orf81 mRNA is found in the testes. mRNA expression may be regulated by the KMT2D transcription factor, a histone methyltransferase, due to a decrease in C19Orf81 expression when KMT2D is down regulated.

== Protein ==
The protein, C19Orf81, is 198 amino acids in length and has a molecular weight of 22.4 kDa. It contains one domain of unknown function, DUF4732, that spans from Gly23 to Leu181. Using DeepLoc 2.0, C19Orf81 has cytoplasm and nuclear localization. Predicted post-translational modifications (PTMs) of the protein, shown below, could indicate intercellular location and activity.

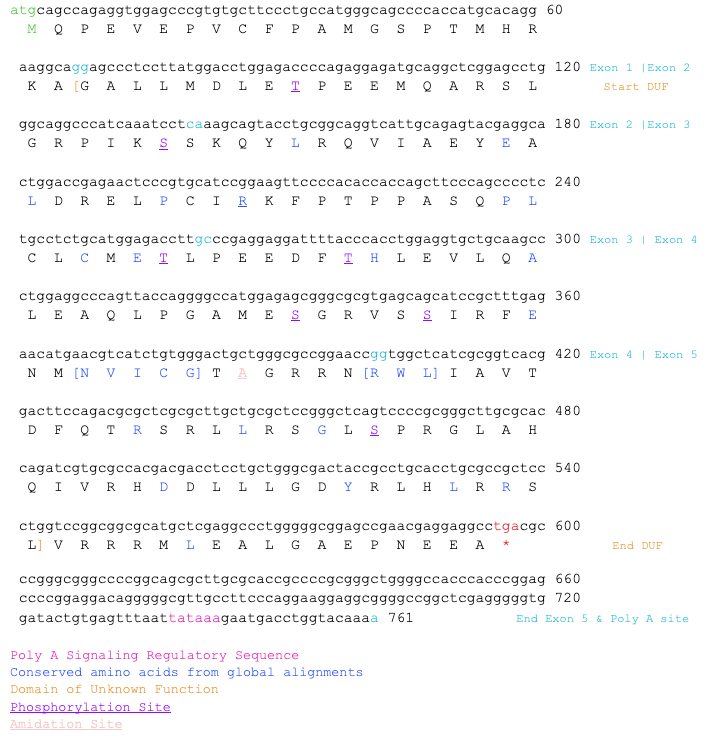
Translational sequence for C19Orf81. The start codon is green, the stop codon is red and the legend is color coded accordingly.

=== Post-translational modifications ===
PTMs predicted using Motif Scan and DTU Health Tec bioinformatic tools.

==== Phosphorylation ====
Casein kinase 2 (CK2): Thr31, Thr86, Thr93

Protein kinase C (PKC): Ser46, Ser111, Ser116, Ser154

Casein kinases, specifically CK2, have been shown to play a role in major cell events such as survival metabolism, growth, protein synthesis, proliferation and DNA repair. In an oncogenic setting, CK2 promotes the cancer cell’s growth due to its interference with apoptotic pathways. CK2 also plays a role in spermatogenesis and germ cell growth.

==== Amidation ====
An amidation site on C19Orf81 is positioned at Arg129 in the snippet ARGG. Amidation of a protein is and important modification necessary for signaling and protein interactions.

=== Structure ===
Secondary structure prediction by CFSSP method displays multiple α-helices and a few β-sheets. A similar pattern seen in the tertiary structure of C19Orf81 by AlphaFold, is shown below

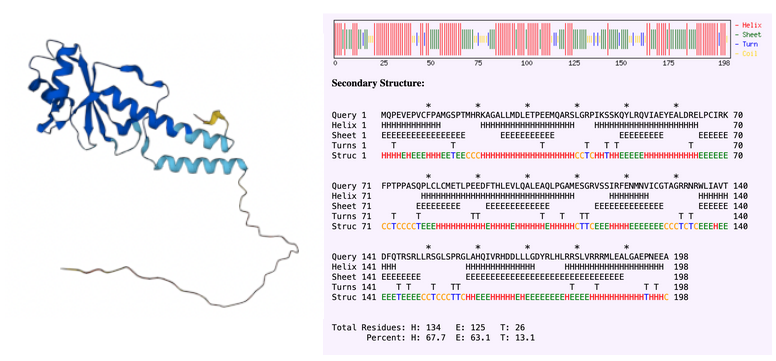
AlphaFold tertiary structure prediction (left). CFSSP secondary structure prediction (right).

=== Function ===
Given C19Orf81’s appearance in early stage spermatogonia cells and lower levels in other stages of spermatogenesis, as shown by expression summaries from the Human Protein Atlas, phosphorylation by CK2 could indicate a role for C19Orf81 in spermatogonial stem cell differentiation and growth.

== Phylogeny ==
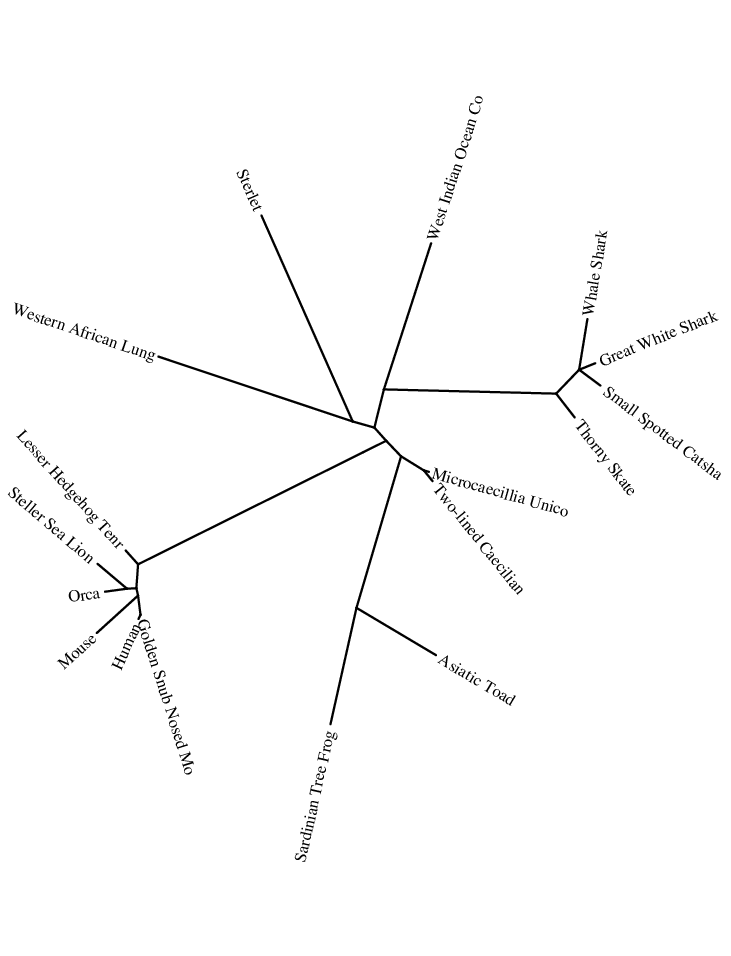
Unrooted phylogenetic tree for C19Orf81 Homologs. Distance apart indicates time since divergence.

Based on data found in the NCBI database and using NCBI BLAST, C19Orf81 has orthologs in all vertebrates except birds.

=== Orthologs ===
Below is a table of ortholog genes of the human C19Orf81 gene found by using NCBI Blast. Sequence similarities were calculated using Emboss Needle Alignment Tool and median date of divergence (million years ago) was retrieved from TimeTree

Summary of 19 Orthologs for C19Orf81
| Genus Species | Common name | Taxonomic Order | Median Date of Divergence (MYA) | Sequence length (aa) | Sequence identity% to Human ! !Sequence similarity% to Human | Accession # | |
|---|---|---|---|---|---|---|---|
| Homo sapiens | Human | Primate | 0 | 198 | 100 | 100 | NP_001182005.1 |
| Rhinopithecus roxellana | Golden Snub-Nosed Monkey | Primate | 28.8 | 198 | 96 | 98 | XP_010367863.1 |
| Piliocolobus tephrosceles | Ugandan Red Colobus | Primate | 28.8 | 198 | 95.5 | 97.5 | XP_023038374.1 |
| Mus musculus | Mouse | Rodentia | 87 | 196 | 78.3 | 88.9 | NP_081325.1 |
| Orcinus orca | Orca | Artiodactyle | 94 | 198 | 84.3 | 91.4 | XP_049559498.1 |
| Eumetopias jubatus | Steller Sea Lion | Carnivora | 94 | 198 | 81.8 | 89.9 | XP_027947235.1 |
| Echinops telfairi | Lesser Hedgehog Tenrec | Afrosoricida | 99 | 198 | 83.3 | 90.4 | XP_012862141.2 |
| Hyla sarda | Sardinian Tree Frog | Anura | 352 | 219 | 33.2 | 47.5 | XP_056398596.1 |
| Bufo gargarizans | Asiatic Toad | Anura | 352 | 254 | 28.8 | 42 | XP_044133453.1 |
| Microcaecilia unicolor | Microcaecilia Unicolor | Gymnophiona | 352 | 212 | 41.7 | 56.6 | XP_030051298.1 |
| Rhinatrema bivittatum | Two-lined Caecilian | Gymnophiona | 352 | 216 | 40.6 | 55.2 | XP_029441218.1 |
| Protopterus annectens | Western African Lungfish | Lepidosireniformes | 408 | 205 | 37.8 | 59 | XP_043915129.1 |
| Latimeria chalumnae | West Indian Ocean Coelacanth | Coelacathiformes | 415 | 219 | 40.3 | 61.5 | XP_014341008.1 |
| Acipenser ruthenus | Sterlet | Aceripensiformes | 429 | 210 | 40.6 | 57.5 | XP_058875337.1 |
| Amblyraja radiata | Thorny Skate | Rajiformes | 462 | 197 | 38.8 | 53.3 | XP_032872447.1 |
| Leucoraja erinacea | Little Skate | Rajiformes | 462 | 197 | 38.8 | 52.9 | XP_055521580.1 |
| Carcharodon carcharias | Great White Shark | Lamniformes | 462 | 198 | 42.3 | 61.4 | XP_041033413.1 |
| Scyliorhinus canicula | Small Spotted Catshark | Carcharhiniformes | 462 | 198 | 38.6 | 55.7 | XP_038639721.1 |
| Chiloscyllium plagiosum | White Spotted Bamboo Shark | Orectolobiformes | 462 | 158 | 36.6 | 54.6 | XP_043535241.1 |
| Rhincodon typus | Whale Shark | Orectolobiformes | 462 | 176 | 39.5 | 60 | XP_020365855.2 |
