= CYP18 family =

Group of cytochrome P450 enzymes

Cytochrome P450, family 18, also known as CYP18, is an animal cytochrome P450 family found in insect genomes. It is involved in insecticide resistance. The first member gene identified was CYP18A1, from a Drosophila melanogaster fly, acting as a dimethylnitrosamine demethylase.
