= Naomichi Matsumoto =

Japanese geneticist

- 松本 直通
- Born: August 3, 1961 (age 65); Saga Prefecture, Japan
- Education: Nagasaki University; Kyushu University
- Known for: Sotos syndrome Marfan syndrome type II; Ohtahara syndrome Coffin–Siris syndrome
- Scientific career
- Fields: Medical genetics
- Workplaces: Yokohama City University; University of Chicago; Nagasaki University
- Doctoral advisor: Norio Niikawa

Naomichi Matsumoto (松本 直通, Matsumoto Naomichi; born August 3, 1961) is a Japanese physician and medical geneticist who identified several causative genes for human diseases, including Sotos syndrome (2002), Marfan syndrome type II (2004), Ohtahara syndrome (2008), West syndrome (2010), Microphthalmia with limb anomalies (2011), Autosomal-recessive cerebellar ataxias (2011), Hypomyelination with cerebellar atrophy and hypoplasia of the corpus callosum (HCAHC) (2011), Porencephaly (2012), and Coffin–Siris syndrome (2012).

Matsumoto has been the editor-in-chief of the scientific journal Journal of Human Genetics since 2014.

== Biography ==
Matsumoto was born in Saga Prefecture, Japan, and completed his M.D. in 1986 from Kyushu University School of Medicine. After residency in obstetrics and gynecology at Kyushu University Hospital, he worked as an obstetrician and gynecologist for several years. Wishing to pursue advanced study in medical genetics, he went to Nagasaki University to study as a graduate student under Norio Niikawa, who discovered Kabuki syndrome. He obtained his doctorate in genetics in 1997 from the same institution, before becoming a postdoctoral fellow at the University of Chicago. He was appointed Professor and Chairman of the Department of Human Genetics at Yokohama City University School of Medicine in 2003.
