= KDM2A =

Protein-coding gene in the species Homo sapiens

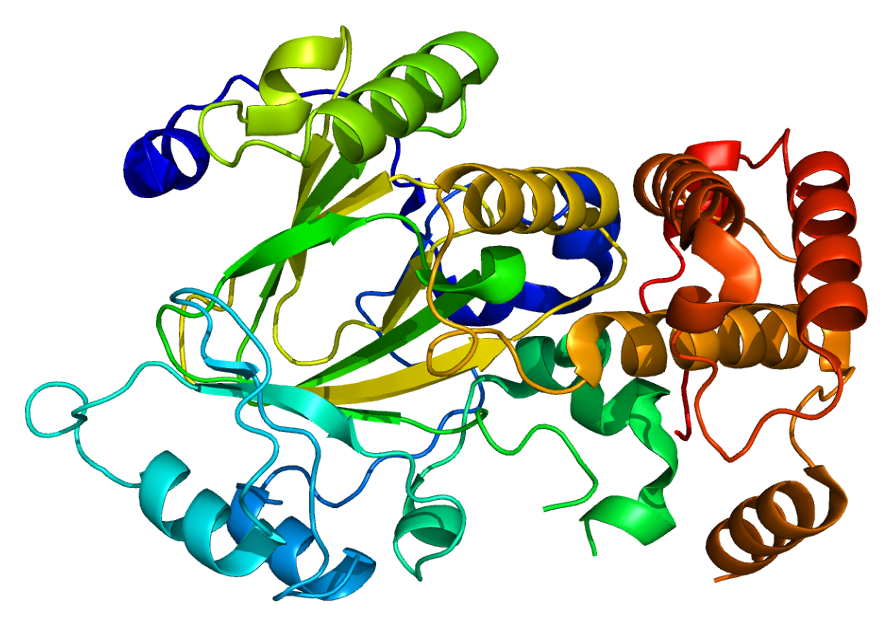

Identifiers
- Aliases: KDM2A, CXXC8, FBL11, FBL7, FBXL11, JHDM1A, LILINA, lysine demethylase 2A
- External IDs: OMIM: 605657; MGI: 1354736; GeneCards: KDM2A
Available structures
PDB	Ortholog search: PDBe RCSB
PDB	List of PDB id codes 2YU1, 2YU2, 4BBQ
Enzyme activity
EC #	BRENDA	ExPASy	KEGG	MetaCyc
1.14.11.27	↗	↗	↗	↗

Gene location (Human)
Chr.	Chromosome 11 (human)
Band	11q13.2	Start	67,119,263 bp
Band	11q13.2	End	67,258,082 bp

Gene location (Mouse)
Chr.	Chromosome 19 (mouse)
Band	19|19 A	Start	4,364,447 bp
Band	19|19 A	End	4,448,313 bp
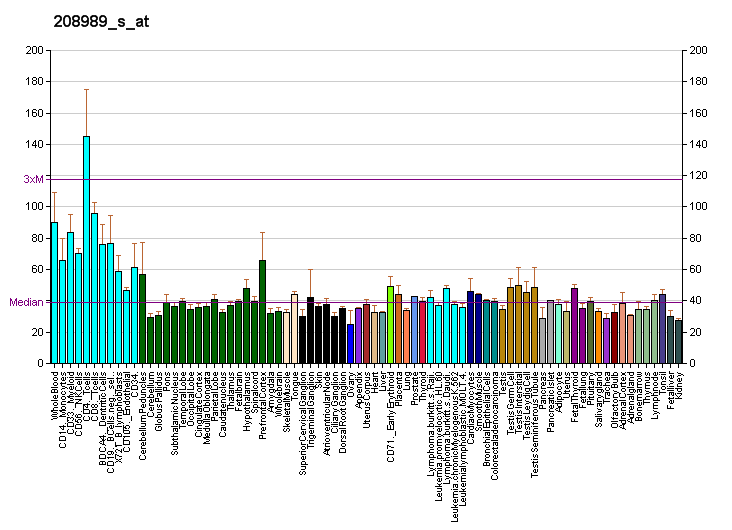

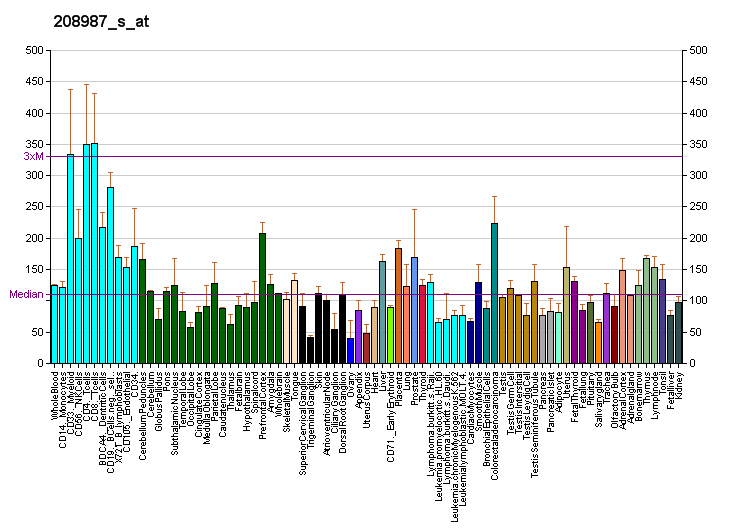

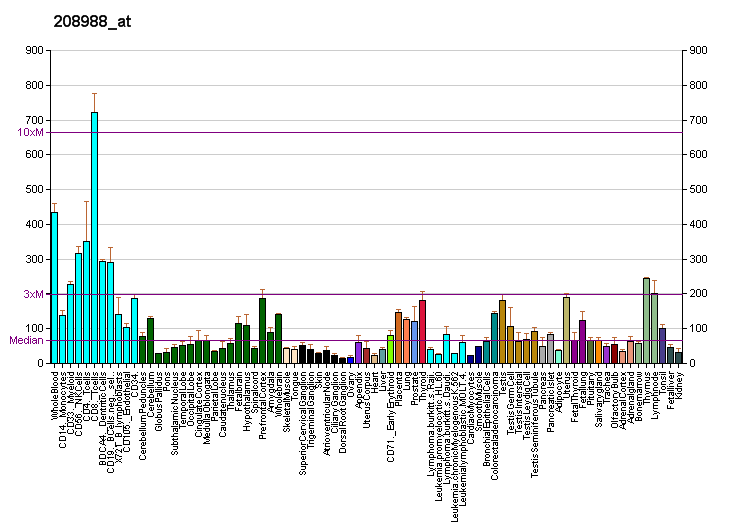
RNA expression pattern
Bgee	Human / Mouse (ortholog); Top expressed in: amniotic fluid; germinal epithelium; tibia; buccal mucosa cell; sural nerve; nipple; visceral pleura; parietal pleura; mucosa of paranasal sinus; bone marrow cell / Top expressed in: hand; genital tubercle; tail of embryo; aortic valve; ascending aorta; mesenteric lymph nodes; granulocyte; neural layer of retina; lumbar subsegment of spinal cord; ventricular zone; More reference expression data
BioGPS	More reference expression data
Gene ontology
Molecular function	DNA binding; oxidoreductase activity; zinc ion binding; dioxygenase activity; metal ion binding; histone demethylase activity; protein binding; histone H3-methyl-lysine-36 demethylase activity; DNA-binding transcription factor activity, RNA polymerase II-specific
Cellular component	nucleoplasm; nucleus
Biological process	double-strand break repair via nonhomologous end joining; regulation of transcription, DNA-templated; histone H3-K36 demethylation; transcription, DNA-templated; chromatin organization; regulation of transcription by RNA polymerase II; negative regulation of transcription by competitive promoter binding; circadian regulation of gene expression; regulation of circadian rhythm; rhythmic process
Sources:Amigo / QuickGO
Orthologs
Databases	NCBI: entry; OMA: entry
Species	Human	Mouse
Entrez	22992	225876
Ensembl	ENSG00000173120	ENSMUSG00000054611
UniProt	Q9Y2K7	P59997
RefSeq (mRNA)	NM_001256405; NM_012308	NM_001001984
RefSeq (protein)	NP_001243334; NP_036440	NP_001001984
Location (UCSC)	Chr 11: 67.12 – 67.26 Mb	Chr 19: 4.36 – 4.45 Mb
PubMed search
- Wikidata
View/Edit Human	View/Edit Mouse

Lysine-specific demethylase 2A (KDM2A) also known as F-box and leucine-rich repeat protein 11 (FBXL11) is an enzyme that in humans is encoded by the KDM2A gene. KDM2A is a member of the superfamily of alpha-ketoglutarate-dependent hydroxylases, which are non-haem iron-containing proteins.

== Function ==
This gene encodes a member of the F-box protein family which is characterized by an approximately 40 amino acid motif, the F-box. The F-box proteins constitute one of the four subunits of ubiquitin protein ligase complex called SCFs (SKP1-cullin-F-box), which function in phosphorylation-dependent ubiquitination. The F-box proteins are divided into 3 classes: Fbws containing WD-40 domains, Fbls containing leucine-rich repeats, and Fbxs containing either different protein-protein interaction modules or no recognizable motifs. The protein encoded by this gene belongs to the Fbls class and, in addition to an F-box, contains at least 6 highly degenerated leucine-rich repeats.

FBXL11/KDM2A is a histone H3 lysine 36 demethylase enzyme. The enzymatic activity of FBXL11/KDM2A relies on a conserved JmjC domain in the N-terminus of the protein that co-ordinates iron and alphaketoglutarate to catalyze demethylation via a hydroxylation based mechanism. It has recently been demonstrated that a ZF-CxxC DNA binding domain within FBXL11/KDM2A has the capacity to interact with non-methylated DNA and this domain targets FBXL11/KDM2A to CpG island regions of the genome where it specifically removes histone H3 lysine 36 methylation. This mechanism acts to create a chromatin environment at CpG islands that highlights these regulatory elements and differentiates them from non-regulatory regions in large complex mammalian genomes. In a study in mouse hepatocytes, this gene was shown to regulate hepatic gluconeogenesis.
