= Journal of Human Genetics =

- Discipline: Human genetics
- Language: English
- Edited by: Toshihiro Tanaka

Publication details
- Former name(s): Japanese Journal of Human Genetics
- History: 1956-present
- Publisher: Nature Publishing Group on behalf of the Japan Society of Human Genetics (Japan)
- Frequency: Monthly
- Impact factor: 3.172 (2020)

Standard abbreviations
- ISO 4: J. Hum. Genet.

Indexing
- CODEN: JHGEFR
- ISSN: 1434-5161 (print); 1435-232X (web)
- LCCN: sn98039238
- OCLC no.: 474778834

Links
- Journal homepage; Online archive

The Journal of Human Genetics is a monthly peer-reviewed scientific journal covering all aspects of human genetics and genomics. It was established in 1956 as the Japanese Journal of Human Genetics and was independently published by the Japan Society of Human Genetics. It obtained its current name in 1992. According to the Journal Citation Reports, Journal of Human Genetics has a 2020 impact factor of 3.172.

== History ==
In 1998, Springer Science+Business Media took over publishing the journal. While under Springer, the publication frequency changed from bimonthly to monthly.

It has been published by the Nature Publishing Group since January 2009.

Since 2014, the editor-in-chief has been Naomichi Matsumoto (Yokohama City University).
