= Kabuki syndrome =

Congenital disorder of genetic origin

- Other names: Niikawa–Kuroki syndrome
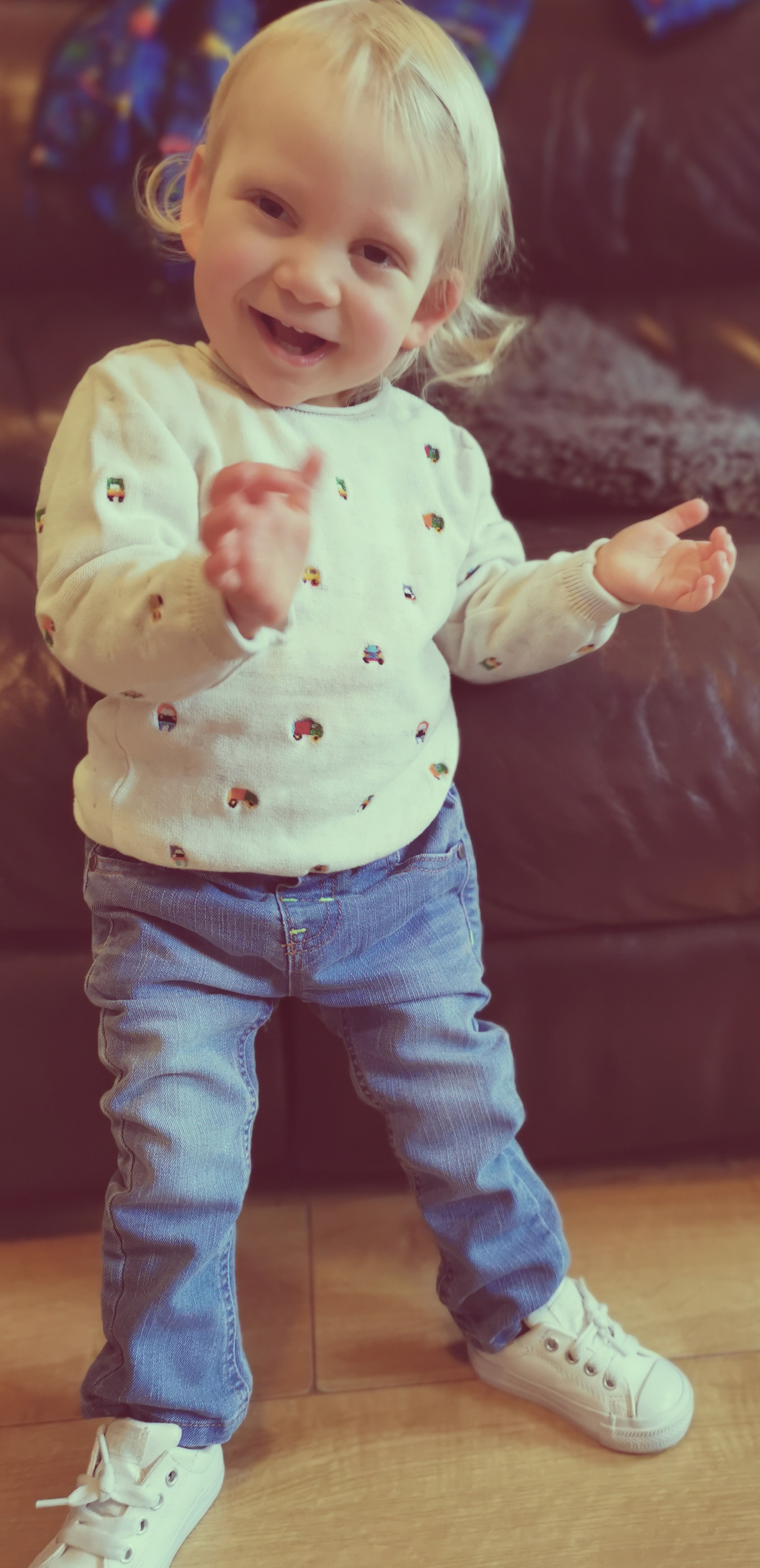
- A child with kabuki syndrome displaying the “scrunchy face”
- Specialty: Medical genetics
- Symptoms: Vary widely among patients but may include: Long eyelashes, depressed nasal tip, atypical fingerprints, ear deformity (macrotia or microtia), hypotonia, joint hyperflexibility, ptosis, blue sclera, cafe au lait spot, GU anomalies (e.g. hypospadias or horseshoe kidney), gi anomalies (e.g. anal atresia or intestinal malformation), hearing loss, immune deficiencies (e.g. hypogammaglobinemia), feeding difficulty (infants), obesity (adulthood), short stature, poor sleep, hyperinsulinemia (hypoglycemia), epilepsy, cardiac defects (e.g. coarctation of the aorta), vertebral anamolies (e.g. butterfly vertebrae), sparse lateral eyelash, finger anomaly (e.g. short 5th finger), cleft palate, dental issues, precocious puberty, scoliosis, hip dysplasia
- Usual onset: Conception
- Types: Type 1 (KMT2D), type 2 (KDM6A); other rare mutations unrecognized for now
- Causes: Loss-of-function mutations in KMT2D or KDM6A genes
- Diagnostic method: Clinical findings; genetic testing
- Differential diagnosis: 3MC syndrome
- Frequency: 1 in 32,000 births

Kabuki syndrome (previously known as Kabuki-makeup syndrome (KMS) or Niikawa–Kuroki syndrome) is a rare congenital disorder of genetic origin. It affects multiple parts of the body, with varying symptoms and severity, although the most common is the characteristic "kumadori-like" facial appearance.

Kabuki syndrome (KS) affects roughly one in 32,000 births. It was first identified and described in 1981 by two Japanese groups, led by scientists Norio Niikawa and Yoshikazu Kuroki. It is named Kabuki syndrome because of the facial resemblance of affected individuals to stage makeup used in kabuki, a Japanese traditional theatrical form.

There are two types of Kabuki syndrome. Type 1 is caused by pathogenic variants in KMT2D and Type 2 is caused by pathogenic variants in KDM6A.

== Signs and symptoms ==
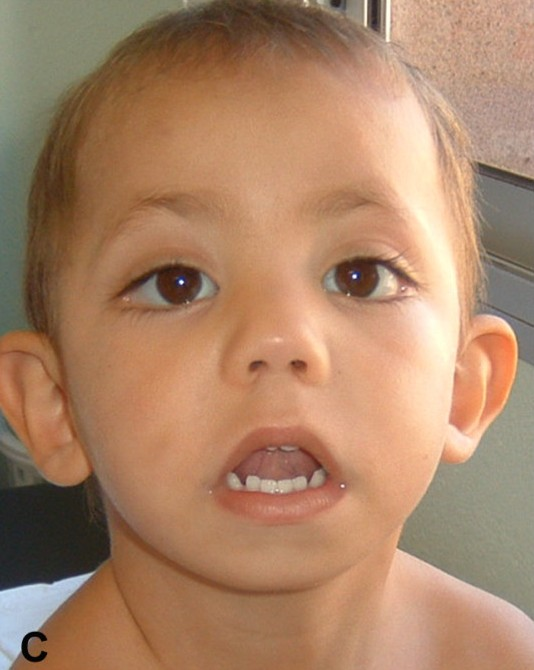
Child displaying typical facial phenotype of Kabuki syndrome

Specific symptoms for Kabuki syndrome vary, with large differences between affected individuals. Most people with Kabuki syndrome have distinctive facial features that include arched eyebrows, long eyelashes, elongated eyelids with lower lids that turn out, prominent ears, a flat tip of the nose and a downward slant to the mouth.

Overlapping phenotypic features for patients between KDM6A and KMT2D variations include prominent ears, abnormal dentition, congenital heart disease, feeding difficulties, cryptorchidism, joint hypermobility, developmental delay, hypotonia, and behavioral difficulties.

Other common symptoms are skeletal abnormalities, short stature, heart defects, feeding difficulties and a failure to thrive, vision and hearing difficulties, weak muscle tone (hypotonia), small head size (microcephaly), and frequent infections.

Mild to moderate intellectual disability and mild to severe developmental delay are often associated with Kabuki syndrome. Infants and young children often experience difficulties relating to hypotonia, feeding issues/failure to thrive, infections, surgical repair of heart and palate defects and developmental delays.

Young children with Kabuki syndrome benefit from early intervention services. School age children tend to have fewer medical issues requiring hospitalization, though frequent infections, hearing loss and feeding issues occur. In addition, intellectual impairment, difficulty with visuospatial tasks and maintaining attention usually require an individualized education plan (IEP) if the child attends public school. Older children and adults report difficulties with anxiety. Endocrine abnormalities and immune system abnormalities such as idiopathic thrombocytopenia (ITP) and common variable immune deficiency (CVID) are medical issues that tend to present in older children, adolescents and adults.

== Causes ==
Type 1 Kabuki syndrome is caused by germline heterozygous loss of function variants in KMT2D (formerly known as the MLL2), located on human chromosome 12. It is estimated that between 55 and 80% of cases of Kabuki syndrome are of Type 1. Type 1 Kabuki syndrome demonstrates an autosomal dominant pattern of inheritance.

Type 2 Kabuki syndrome is caused by germline hemizygous (in males) or heterozygous (in females) chromosome deletions or loss of function point variants involving KDM6A (formerly known as UTX), located on the X chromosome. Approximately 5% of cases of Kabuki syndrome are of Type 2. Type 2 Kabuki syndrome demonstrates an X-linked dominant pattern of inheritance.

Most cases of Kabuki syndrome occur de novo. That is, the mutation did not come from the parents and the gene was mutated early in embryological development. However, several cases of inherited mutations causing Type 1 or Type 2 Kabuki syndrome are now known.

Some cases of Kabuki syndrome have no identifiable causative mutation. These may be caused by types of mutations that are difficult to detect via current routine investigations. Another possibility is that these patients have other disorders that share some features with Kabuki syndrome.

== Pathophysiology ==
The KMT2D and KDM6A genes belong to a family of genes called chromatin-modifying enzymes. Specifically, these genes code for a histone methyltransferase (KMT2D) and a histone demethylase (KDM6A), and play a part in the regulation of gene expression. Under normal circumstances, these enzymes transfer methyl groups on and off histones to regulate genes via epigenetic pathways. When the genes that encode these enzymes are mutated, epigenetic activation of certain developmental genes is impaired and developmental abnormalities occur, leading to the characteristics of Kabuki syndrome patients. The specific developmental genes that are affected by the impaired epigenetic mechanisms in Kabuki syndrome are not yet fully known.

There are hundreds of different mutations that have been identified in Kabuki syndrome patients. Most of these mutations are in the KMT2D gene and involve a change in amino acid sequence that creates a shortened and nonfunctional chromatin-modifying enzyme.

== Diagnosis ==
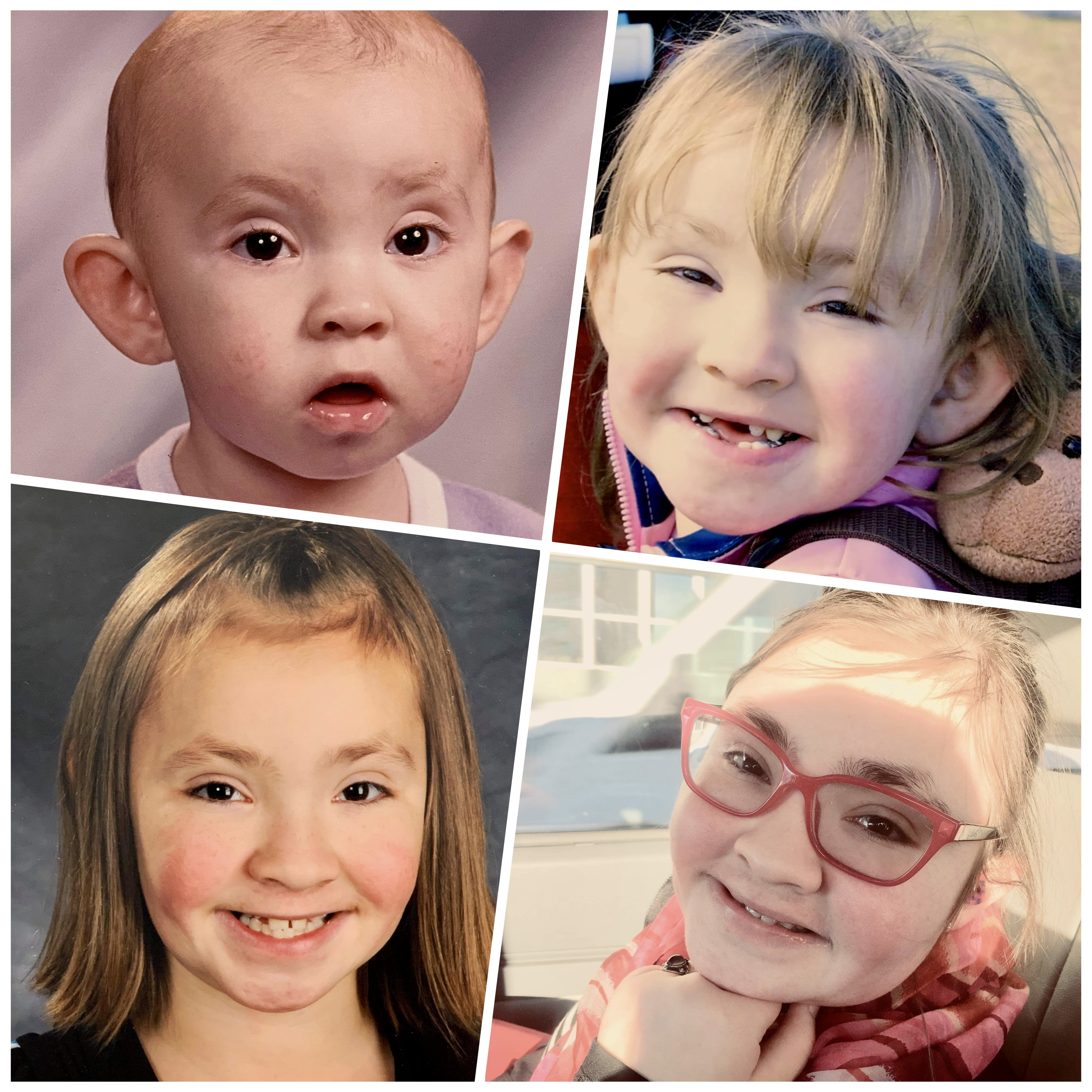
Individual with Kabuki Syndrome from infancy to adulthood

Kabuki syndrome is diagnosed with genetic testing (targeted, whole exome or whole genome sequencing). When genetic testing is not available, Kabuki syndrome is diagnosed clinically (through identifying symptoms, physical exams, and lab results), most commonly by a geneticist.

A consensus on clinical diagnostic criteria for KS was defined in December 2018 by an international group of experts. The authors propose that a definitive diagnosis can be made in an individual of any age with a history of infantile hypotonia, developmental delay and/or intellectual disability, and one or both of the following major criteria:

1. a pathogenic or likely pathogenic variant in KMT2D or KDM6A; and (2) typical dysmorphic features (defined below) at some point of life. Typical dysmorphic features include long palpebral fissures with eversion of the lateral third of the lower eyelid and two or more of the following: (1) arched and broad eyebrows with the lateral third displaying notching or sparseness;
2. short columella with depressed nasal tip;
3. large, prominent or cupped ears; and
4. persistent fingertip pads.

Further criteria for a probable and possible diagnosis, including a table of suggestive clinical features, were included in the publication.

The original description of Kabuki syndrome by Niikawa et al. defined five cardinal manifestations, although some of these “cardinal manifestations” may or may not be present in a patient with Kabuki syndrome.

1. Typical facial features: Elongated palpebral fissures with eversion of the lateral third of the lower eyelid; arched and broad eyebrows with the lateral third displaying sparseness or notching; short columella with depressed nasal tip; large, prominent, or cupped ears
2. Skeletal anomalies: Spinal column abnormalities, including sagittal cleft vertebrae, butterfly vertebrae, narrow intervertebral disc space, and/or scoliosis, Brachydactyly V Brachymesophalangy Clinodactyly of fifth digits
3. Dermatoglyphic abnormalities: persistence of fetal fingertip pads
4. Mild to moderate intellectual disability
5. Postnatal growth deficiency

Diagnosis can be difficult given the large spectrum of disease. The fact that some patients do not carry one of the two known mutations or can carry multiple mutations complicates the diagnosis further. In 2017, researchers published work that showed people with Kabuki syndrome have a unique pattern of DNA methylation. This unique methylation pattern may lead to new ways to diagnose Kabuki syndrome in those who do not show mutations in KMT2D or KDM6A, but still present with a Kabuki syndrome phenotype.

== Screening ==
Due to its rarity, Kabuki syndrome is not screened for in routine prenatal testing including blood tests, chorionic villus sampling (CVS), or amniocentesis. Although not routine for the general population, if Kabuki syndrome is a specific concern (i.e. expectant mother who has been diagnosed with Kabuki syndrome or sibling with KS), it is possible to test for one of the specific mutations. This prenatal testing does require a CVS or amniocentesis. However Kabuki syndrome is usually not inherited and therefore most cases do not have a positive family history. Kabuki syndrome can have positive screening tests, such as cystic hygroma seen on nuchal translucency ultrasound screening, although these findings are non-specific and have a wide differential diagnosis.

== Management ==
Management is supportive, aimed at improving quality of life. Newly diagnosed patients with Kabuki syndrome will often undergo tests that are aimed at detecting common abnormalities associated with the syndrome. They include an echocardiogram (ultrasound of the heart) for detection of structural heart defects, kidney ultrasound for detection of structural renal abnormalities, immunoglobulin levels, pneumococcal titers and a hearing screening test. Further evaluation and testing by specialists may be indicated in addition to cardiology, nephrology, allergy/immunology, audiology-mentioned above. This may include orthopedics (such as hip dysplasia), pulmonary (sleep study to rule out obstructive sleep apnea due to hypotonia), ophthalmology evaluation (vision screen), ENT evaluation (hearing evaluation), Neurology evaluation (i.e. if seizures present), Hematology evaluation (if bleeding disorder), GI evaluation (if gi abnormalities), or others as needed.

There are currently no Kabuki syndrome specific treatments and there is no cure. Treatment plans are customized to address the symptoms the individual is experiencing. For example, someone experiencing seizures will be treated with the standard anti-epilepsy therapies. Additionally, patients with Kabuki syndrome are routinely evaluated and monitored to address problems that may develop, such as vision or hearing problems, or cognitive difficulties. If congenital heart disease is present, prophylactic antibiotics may be recommended before any procedures such as dental work that might cause infection.

== Prognosis ==
Life expectancy is not shortened in most cases of Kabuki syndrome. Some patients have coexisting conditions which may shorten life expectancy, such as hypoplastic left heart syndrome or kidney dysfunction. It is important that patients with cardiac, renal, or immunologic issues are identified and well-managed.

== Epidemiology ==
Kabuki syndrome occurs about once in every 32,000 births. The disease appears to affect all population groups equally, with no differences based on sex, race, or environment. In 2023, a project called Kabuki Count was launched by a global collection of patient advocacy groups (led by the Kabuki Syndrome Foundation) as a global census to document how many people have Kabuki syndrome worldwide.

== Research ==
Research on Kabuki syndrome is limited due to its low incidence. Despite this, several groups around the world are studying Kabuki syndrome.

In the United States, these include Dr. Hans Bjornson at Johns Hopkins University, The Roya Kabuki Program at Boston Children's Hospital, Dr. Mark Hannibal at the University of Michigan, Dr. Margaret Adam at Seattle Children's Hospital, Dr. Jacqui Harris at Kennedy Krieger Institute, as well as groups at University of Colorado, University of Utah, University of South Florida and others.

In the UK, Prof Siddharth Banka's group at the University of Manchester and Manchester University Hospitals has a research program for Kabuki syndrome. In Canada, Dr. Rosanna Weksberg at SickKids and University of Toronto. Several European groups based in Italy, France, Germany and the Netherlands are also actively working on improving understanding of the condition and to identifying potential treatments.

In 2018, the Kabuki Syndrome Foundation was established to accelerate research efforts to treat or cure Kabuki syndrome. They launched the Kabuki Syndrome Outcome measures and Biomarkers Consortium (KSOC) in 2023 which is a collaborative clinical research study of Kabuki syndrome biomarkers.

== History ==
In 1969, Norio Niikawa MD, a geneticist in Japan, was treating a child patient presenting with unique facial characteristics and various health problems. Never having seen this constellation of symptoms before, Dr Niikawa wondered if he was faced with an undiagnosed condition, a disorder with a genetic basis. Over the next several years, this physician treated several other patients with the same symptoms in his outpatient genetics clinic, furthering support for a disorder never before diagnosed.

In 1979, Dr Niikawa presented his findings and hypothesis at the first Japan Dysmorphology Conference. A fellow physician at this conference, Yoshikazu Kuroki, recognized the symptoms, and realized that he had also seen several paediatric patients with this presentation; he presented two of his own cases at the second annual conference the following year. In 1981, the two doctors separately submitted articles on this new diagnosis to the Journal of Pediatrics.

Dr Niikawa coined the term 'Kabuki syndrome' (also known as Kabuki make-up syndrome or Niikawa–Kuroki syndrome) as a reference to traditional Japanese theatre which he respected greatly. Many of the children presenting with this diagnosis had unusual, elongated lower eyelids, and this feature was reminiscent of the theatrical make-up worn by actors in Kabuki theatre.

As reported by Dr. Niikawa "The name, 'Kabuki make-up', of the syndrome was given by myself, because the facial appearance of patients, especially eversion of their lower eyelids, is reminiscent of the makeup of actors in Kabuki, the traditional form of Japanese theater. Kabuki was founded early in the 17th century in Japan and over the next 300 years developed into a sophisticated form of theater. Kabuki actors usually apply traditional makeup to strengthen their eyes, especially in a hero play, and they are very proud of their performing art."

The genes for Kabuki syndrome were discovered in 2010 and 2012 for Type 1 and Type 2 Kabuki syndrome respectively.

== In popular culture ==
- The Good Doctor is an American medical drama television series that airs on ABC. Season five's ninth episode features Matthew Horner, an actor with Kabuki syndrome.
- Nineteen Paper Cranes is a short documentary by Michael Joseph McDonald. The film follows a deaf Japanese papermaker with Kabuki syndrome as she memorializes the nineteen victims of the Sagamihara stabbings.

	Website
Patient Advocacy	All Things Kabuki
	Kabuki UK
	Supporting Aussie Kids with Kabuki Syndrome (SAKKS)
	Association Syndrome Kabuki
Research	Kabuki Syndrome Foundation
	Roya Kabuki Program
Conferences/Gatherings	Texas Kabuki Gathering
