= WDR90 =

Protein-coding gene in the species Homo sapiens

Identifiers
- Aliases: WDR90, C16orf15, C16orf16, C16orf17, C16orf18, C16orf19, WD repeat domain 90, POC16
- External IDs: OMIM: 618290; MGI: 1921267; GeneCards: WDR90

Gene location (Human)
Chr.	Chromosome 16 (human)
Band	16p13.3	Start	649,311 bp
Band	16p13.3	End	667,833 bp

Gene location (Mouse)
Chr.	Chromosome 17 (mouse)
Band	17|17 A3.3	Start	26,063,745 bp
Band	17|17 A3.3	End	26,080,475 bp
RNA expression pattern
Bgee	Human / Mouse (ortholog); Top expressed in: right uterine tube; right testis; left testis; right lobe of thyroid gland; anterior pituitary; left lobe of thyroid gland; left ovary; left adrenal cortex; right adrenal gland; right adrenal cortex / Top expressed in: islet of Langerhans; bone marrow; ventricular zone; epiblast; spermatid; choroidal fissure; ovary; testicle; neural layer of retina; lens; More reference expression data
BioGPS	n/a
Gene ontology
Molecular function	protein binding
Cellular component	centriole; cytoplasm; cytoskeleton; axoneme; ciliary basal body
Biological process	cilium assembly; cell projection organization
Sources:Amigo / QuickGO
Orthologs
Databases	NCBI: entry; OMA: entry
Species	Human	Mouse
Entrez	197335	106618
Ensembl	ENSG00000161996	ENSMUSG00000073434
UniProt	Q96KV7	Q6ZPG2
RefSeq (mRNA)	NM_145294; NM_153239	NM_001163766; NM_134124
RefSeq (protein)	NP_660337	NP_001157238
Location (UCSC)	Chr 16: 0.65 – 0.67 Mb	Chr 17: 26.06 – 26.08 Mb
PubMed search
- Wikidata
View/Edit Human	View/Edit Mouse

WD repeat-containing protein 90 is a protein that, in humans, is encoded by the WDR90 gene. This human protein is 1750 amino acids, and has a molecular weight of 187.7 kDa. It contains multiple WD40 repeat domains and one domain of unknown function. This protein is conserved all the way back to invertebrates. Proteins containing WD transducin repeating domains have been found to play a role in a variety of functions ranging from signal transduction and transcription regulation to cell cycle control, autophagy and apoptosis.

== Gene ==
In the human genome, WDR90 spans from base pairs 649363 to 667833, and has an mRNA sequence that is 5,250 nucleotides in length. This gene consists of 41 exons and encodes for a 1,750 amino acid protein in humans.

=== Locus ===
This human gene is located in the positive DNA strand on chromosome 16 at the position 16p13.3. Flanking sequences on the positive strand include FAM195A and RHOT2.

=== Aliases ===
Aliases for WDR90 include: C16orf15, C16orf16, C16orf17, C16orf18, C16orf19, and KIAA1924.

== Homology ==
=== Paralogs ===
One human paralog for WDR90 has been found. This paralog is known as WDR16. According to UniProtKB/Swiss-Prot, WDR16 may play an essential role in growth or survival of hepatocellular carcinoma. This protein in humans if 620 amino acids long.

=== Orthologs ===
Orthologs for protein WDR90 are found conserved all the way back to single invertebrates. There were three conserved domains across mammals, DUF667 (location 3-124), and two WD40 repeats (locations 697-991, and 1155-1549).

Sequence comparisons of WDR90 in humans and its orthologs.

== Protein ==
=== Primary sequence ===
Human protein WDR90 is 287.7 kDa, with an isoelectric point of 6.584. There is a domain of unknown function called DUF667 that is conserved across its 30 predicted isoforms.

Domains and locations on the human WDR90 gene.

=== Post-translational modifications ===
WDR90 is predicted to be a heavily phosphorylated protein.

=== Domains and motifs ===
There are three domains that repeat throughout the human sequence.

Protein WDR90 primary amino acid sequence and its internal features/structures.

=== Secondary structure ===
The de novo protein structure of WDR90 in humans is predicted to possess beta sheets, beta turns, and random coils.

=== Tertiary and quaternary structure ===
The human protein WDR90 adopts a 7-bladed beta propeller that is indicative of the WD40 repeat family. This structure was predicted with 100% confidence by the structure predicting program Phyre2.

== Interacting proteins ==
The most notable proteins that interact with human WDR90 are predicted to be UTY, KDM6B, SETD1B, and ASH2L. These proteins are primarily found as histone modifiers.

=== Transcription factors ===
The promoter for WDR90 in humans has been predicted to have domains for the transcription factors: ARNT, AP-1, MYB, and Cis2His2.

== Expression ==
Expression levels of human WDR90 appear to be relatively constituent in low levels, with its highest levels in the lymph nodes and thymus. The expression of WDR90 in development is the highest in blastocyst and fetal stages. Expression is notably absent from the neonatal and infant stages, then comes back during juvenile and persists through adulthood.

== Function ==
The function of WDR90 in humans in not well known. Given its broad expression in many tissues, its ties to the protein superfamily WD40 domain-containing proteins, and the known protein interactions, it could play a role in histone modifications, vesicular transport, or transcription regulation.
