= KMT2D =

Protein-coding gene in humans

Identifiers
- Aliases: KMT2D, ALR, KABUK1, MLL2, MLL4, lysine methyltransferase 2D, histone-lysine methyltransferase 2D, TNRC21, AAD10, KMS, CAGL114
- External IDs: OMIM: 602113; MGI: 2682319; GeneCards: KMT2D
Available structures
PDB	Ortholog search: PDBe RCSB
PDB	List of PDB id codes 3UVK, 4ERQ, 4Z4P
Enzyme activity
EC #	BRENDA	ExPASy	KEGG	MetaCyc
2.1.1.364	↗	↗	↗	↗

Gene location (Human)
Chr.	Chromosome 12 (human)
Band	12q13.12	Start	49,018,975 bp
Band	12q13.12	End	49,060,794 bp

Gene location (Mouse)
Chr.	Chromosome 15 (mouse)
Band	15|15 F1	Start	98,729,550 bp
Band	15|15 F1	End	98,769,085 bp
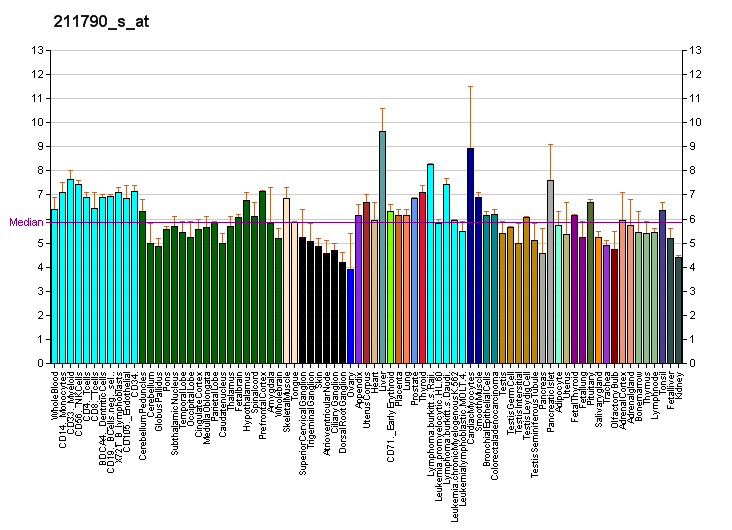

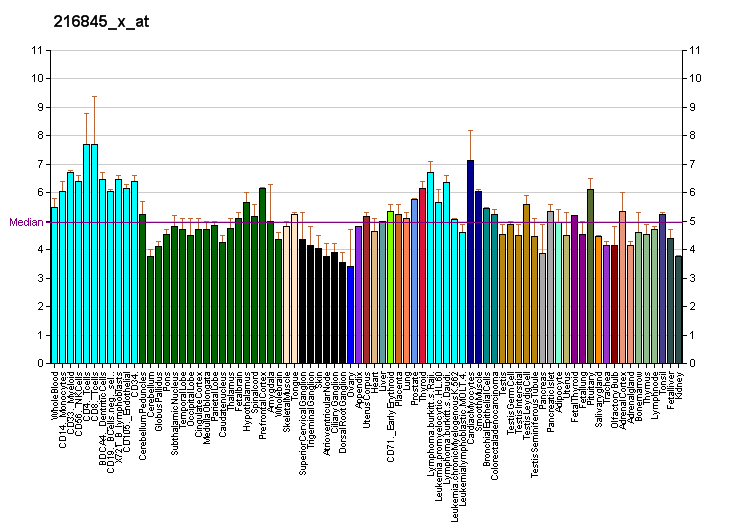
RNA expression pattern
Bgee	Human / Mouse (ortholog); Top expressed in: buccal mucosa cell; internal globus pallidus; sural nerve; tendon of biceps brachii; granulocyte; cardia; right uterine tube; gastrocnemius muscle; right hemisphere of cerebellum; left uterine tube / Top expressed in: zygote; neural layer of retina; secondary oocyte; granulocyte; tail of embryo; muscle of thigh; superior frontal gyrus; primary visual cortex; lip; ventricular zone; More reference expression data
BioGPS	More reference expression data
Gene ontology
Molecular function	metal ion binding; transferase activity; DNA binding; methyltransferase activity; protein binding; histone-lysine N-methyltransferase activity; histone methyltransferase activity (H3-K4 specific); DNA-binding transcription factor activity, RNA polymerase II-specific; transcription coactivator activity; histone binding
Cellular component	nucleoplasm; MLL3/4 complex; nucleus; histone methyltransferase complex
Biological process	positive regulation of intracellular estrogen receptor signaling pathway; transcription, DNA-templated; methylation; positive regulation of cell population proliferation; oogenesis; oocyte growth; response to estrogen; positive regulation of transcription by RNA polymerase II; histone H3-K4 methylation; regulation of transcription, DNA-templated; beta-catenin-TCF complex assembly; regulation of megakaryocyte differentiation; chromatin organization
Sources:Amigo / QuickGO
Orthologs
Databases	NCBI: entry; OMA: entry
Species	Human	Mouse
Entrez	8085	381022
Ensembl	ENSG00000167548	ENSMUSG00000048154
UniProt	O14686	Q6PDK2
RefSeq (mRNA)	NM_003482	NM_001033276; NM_001033388
RefSeq (protein)	NP_003473	NP_001028448
Location (UCSC)	Chr 12: 49.02 – 49.06 Mb	Chr 15: 98.73 – 98.77 Mb
PubMed search
- Wikidata
View/Edit Human	View/Edit Mouse

Histone-lysine N-methyltransferase 2D (KMT2D), also known as MLL4 and sometimes MLL2 in humans and Mll4 in mice, is a major mammalian histone H3 lysine 4 (H3K4) mono-methyltransferase. It is part of a family of six Set1-like H3K4 methyltransferases that also contains KMT2A (or MLL1), KMT2B (or MLL2), KMT2C (or MLL3), KMT2F (or SET1A), and KMT2G (or SET1B).

KMT2D is a large protein over 5,500 amino acids in size and is widely expressed in adult tissues. The protein co-localizes with lineage determining transcription factors on transcriptional enhancers and is essential for cell differentiation and embryonic development. It also plays critical roles in regulating cell fate transition, metabolism, and tumor suppression.

Mutations in KMT2D cause human genetic conditions including Kabuki syndrome, another distinct congenital malformations disorder and various forms of cancer.

== Structure ==
=== Gene ===
In mice, KMT2D is coded by the Kmt2d gene located on chromosome 15F1. Its transcript is 19,823 base pairs long and contains 55 exons and 54 introns.

In humans, KMT2D is coded by the KMT2D gene located on chromosome 12q13.12. Its transcript is 19,419 base pairs long and contains 54 exons and 53 introns.

=== Protein ===
KMT2D is homologous to Trithorax-related (Trr), which is a Trithorax-group protein. The mouse and human KMT2D proteins are 5,588 and 5,537 amino acids in length, respectively. Both species of the protein weigh about 600 kDa. KMT2D contains an enzymatically active C-terminal SET domain that is responsible for its methyltransferase activity and maintaining protein stability in cells. Near the SET domain are a plant homeotic domain (PHD) and FY-rich N/C-terminal (FYRN and FYRC) domains. The protein also contains six N-terminal PHDs, a high mobility group (HMG-I), and nine nuclear receptor interacting motifs (LXXLLs). It was shown that amino acids Y5426 and Y5512 are critical for the enzymatic activity of human KMT2D in vitro. In addition, mutation of Y5477 in mouse KMT2D, which corresponds to Y5426 in human KMT2D, resulted in the inactivation of KMT2D's enzymatic activity in embryonic stem cells. Depletion of cellular H3K4 methylation reduces KMT2D levels, indicating that the protein's stability could be regulated by cellular H3K4 methylation.

=== Protein complex ===
Several components of the KMT2D complex were first purified in 2003, and then the entire complex was identified in 2007. Along with KMT2D, the complex also contains ASH2L, RbBP5, WDR5, DPY30, NCOA6, UTX (also known as KDM6A), PA1, and PTIP. WDR5, RbBP5, ASH2L, and DPY30 form the four-subunit sub-complex WRAD, which is critical for H3K4 methyltransferase activity in all mammalian Set1-like histone methyltransferase complexes. WDR5 binds directly with FYRN/FYRC domains of C-terminal SET domain-containing fragments of human KMT2C and KMT2D. UTX, the complex's H3K27 demethylase, PTIP, and PA1 are subunits that are unique to KMT2C and KMT2D. KMT2D acts as a scaffold protein within the complex; absence of KMT2D results in destabilization of UTX and collapse of the complex in cells.

== Enhancer regulation ==
KMT2D is a major enhancer mono-methyltransferase and has partial functional redundancy with KMT2C. The protein selectively binds enhancer regions based on type of cell and stage of differentiation. During differentiation, lineage determining transcription factors recruit KMT2D to establish cell-type specific enhancers. For example, CCAAT/enhancer-binding protein β (C/EBPβ), an early adipogenic transcription factor, recruits and requires KMT2D to establish a subset of adipogenic enhancers during adipogenesis. Depletion of KMT2D prior to differentiation prevents the accumulation of H3K4 mono-methylation (H3K4me1), H3K27 acetylation, the transcriptional coactivator Mediator, and RNA polymerase II on enhancers, resulting in severe defects in gene expression and cell differentiation. KMT2C and KMT2D also identify super-enhancers and are required for formation of super-enhancers during cell differentiation. Mechanistically, KMT2C and KMT2D are required for the binding of H3K27 acetyltransferases CREB-binding protein (CBP) and/or p300 on enhancers, enhancer activation, and enhancer-promotor looping prior to gene transcription. The KMT2C and KMT2D proteins, rather than the KMT2C and KMT2D-mediated H3K4me1, control p300 recruitment to enhancers, enhancer activation, and transcription from promoters in embryonic stem cells.

== Functions ==
=== Development ===
Whole-body knockout of Kmt2d in mice results in early embryonic lethality. Targeted knockout of Kmt2d in precursors cells of brown adipocytes and myocytes results in decreases in brown adipose tissue and muscle mass in mice, indicating that KMT2D is required for adipose and muscle tissue development. In the hearts of mice, a single copy of the Kmt2d gene is sufficient for normal heart development. Complete loss of Kmt2d in cardiac precursors and myocardium leads to severe cardiac defects and early embryonic lethality. KMT2D mediated mono- and di-methylation is required for maintaining necessary gene expression programs during heart development. Knockout studies in mice also show that KMT2D is required for proper B-cell development.

=== Cell fate transition ===
KMT2D is partially functionally redundant with KMT2C and is required for cell differentiation in culture. KMT2D regulates the induction of adipogenic and myogenic genes and is required for cell-type specific gene expression during differentiation. KMT2C and KMT2D are essential for adipogenesis and myogenesis. Similar functions are seen in neuronal and osteoblast differentiation. KMT2D facilitates cell fate transition by priming enhancers (through H3K4me1) for p300-mediated activation. For p300 to bind the enhancer, the physical presence of KMT2D, and not just the KMT2D-mediated H3K4me1, is required. However, KMT2D is dispensable for maintaining embryonic stem cell and somatic cell identity.

=== Metabolism ===
KMT2D is partially functionally redundant with KMT2C in the liver as well. Heterozygous Kmt2d^{±} mice exhibit enhanced glucose tolerance and insulin sensitivity and increased serum bile acid. KMT2C and KMT2D are significant epigenetic regulators of the hepatic circadian clock and are co-activators of the circadian transcription factors retinoid-related orphan receptor (ROR)-α and -γ. In mice, KMT2D also acts as a coactivator of PPARγ within the liver to direct over-nutrition induced steatosis. Heterozygous Kmt2d^{±} mice exhibit resistance to over-nutrition induced hepatic steatosis.

=== Tumor suppression ===
KMT2C and KMT2D along with NCOA6 act as coactivators of p53, a well-established tumor suppressor and transcription factor, and are necessary for endogenous expression of p53 in response to doxorubicin, a DNA damaging agent. KMT2C and KMT2D have also been implicated with tumor suppressor roles in acute myeloid leukemia, follicular lymphoma, and diffuse large B cell lymphoma. Knockout of Kmt2d in mice negatively affects the expression of tumor suppressor genes TNFAIP3, SOCS3, and TNFRSF14.

Conversely, KMT2D deficiency in several breast and colon cancer cell lines leads to reduced proliferation. Increased KMT2D was shown to facilitate chromatin opening and recruitment of transcription factors, including estrogen receptor (ER), in ER-positive breast cancer cells. Thus, KMT2D may have diverse effects on tumor suppression in different cell types.

== Clinical significance ==
Germline heterozygous loss of function mutations in KMT2D, also known as MLL2 in humans, cause Kabuki syndrome type 1 with mutational occurrence rates between 56% and 75%. Mosaic mutations and intragenic deletions and duplications have also been described in this condition. Type 1 Kabuki syndrome is characterised by developmental delay, intellectual disability, postnatal dwarfism, recognizable facial dysmorphism (reminiscent of the make-up of actors of Kabuki theatre), a broad and depressed nasal tip, large prominent earlobes, a cleft or high-arched palate, scoliosis, short fifth finger, persistence of fingerpads, radiographic abnormalities of the vertebrae, hands, and hip joints, and recurrent otitis media in infancy. Note that variants in a functionally related gene, KDM6A, cause Kabuki syndrome type 2 that is an X-linked condition, shares several clinical features with Kabuki syndrome type 1 but phenotypically is a much more variable condition.

Germline heterozygous missense variants in exon 38 or 39 of the KMT2D gene cause another rare distinct multiple malformation disorder characterized by choanal atresia, athelia or hypoplastic nipples, branchial sinus abnormalities, neck pits, lacrimal duct anomalies, hearing loss, external ear malformations, and thyroid abnormalities.

Congenital heart disease has been associated with an excess of mutations in genes that regulate H3K4 methylation, including KMT2D.

Somatic frameshift and nonsense mutations in the SET and PHD domains affect 37% and 60%, respectively, of the total KMT2D mutations in cancers. Cancers with somatic mutations in KMT2D occur most commonly in the brain, lymph nodes, blood, lungs, large intestine, and endometrium. These cancers include medulloblastoma, pheochromocytoma, non-Hodgkin lymphomas, cutaneous T-cell lymphoma, Sézary syndrome, bladder, lung, and endometrial carcinomas, esophageal squamous cell carcinoma, pancreatic cancer, and prostate cancer.
