= Health Sciences University of Hokkaido =

Coordinates: 43°13′53″N 141°32′56″E

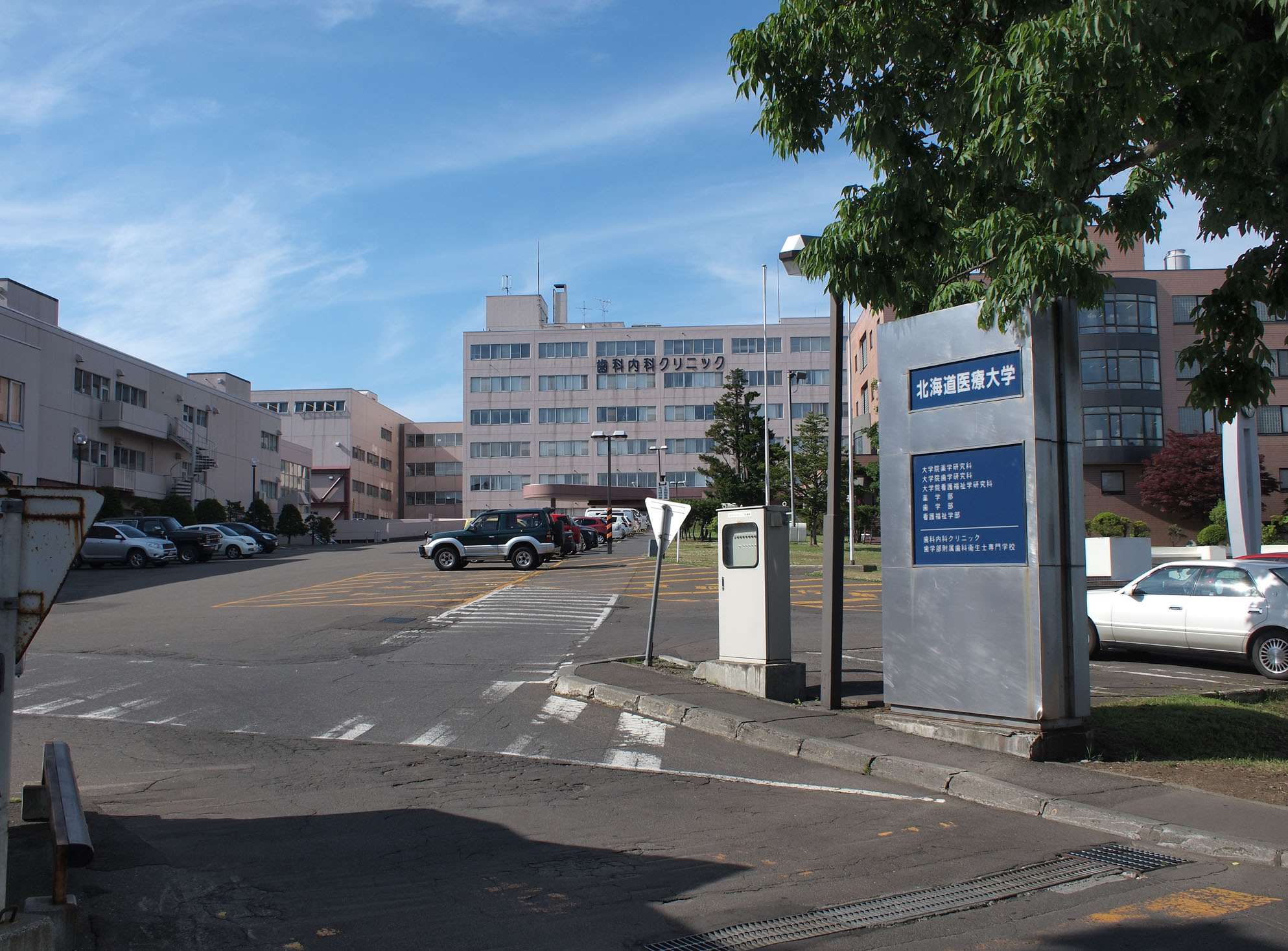
- HSUH Tobetsu Campus, July 2011
- Motto: 知育・徳育・体育
- Motto in English: Intellectual, moral and physical education
- Type: Private
- Established: 1974
- Chairman: Norio Niikawa
- Undergraduates: 3053
- Postgraduates: 132
- Location: Tobetsu, Hokkaido, Japan
- Campus: Tobetsu
- Website: www.hoku-iryo-u.ac.jp

The Health Sciences University of Hokkaido (北海道医療大学, Hokkaidō Iryō Daigaku) (HSUH) is a private university in Tobetsu, Hokkaido, Japan, established in 1974. The president is Norio Niikawa.

== Organization ==
=== Undergraduate ===
- Pharmaceutical science
- Dentistry
- Nursing & social services
- Psychological science
- Rehabilitation science

=== Graduate ===
- Pharmaceutical science
- Dentistry
- Nursing & social services
- Psychological science
- Rehabilitation science

== See also ==
- Hokkaidō-Iryōdaigaku Station, the nearby railway station, named after the university
