= Norio Niikawa =

Japanese physician and medical geneticist

- 新川 詔夫
- Born: 8 May 1942
- Died: 4 April 2022 (aged 79)
- Education: Hokkaido University
- Known for: Kabuki syndrome Earwax gene
- Scientific career
- Fields: Pediatrics; Medical genetics
- Workplaces: Health Sciences University of Hokkaido; Nagasaki University; Geneva University; Hokkaido University
- Doctoral students: Naomichi Matsumoto

Norio Niikawa (新川 詔夫, Niikawa Norio; 8 May 1942 – 11 April 2020) was a Japanese physician and medical geneticist who discovered an autosomal dominant disorder, Kabuki syndrome, also known as Niikawa-Kuroki syndrome.

== Contribution ==
Niikawa made an important contribution in the field of medical genetics. In 1981, he discovered a novel syndrome, Kabuki syndrome, and later he and his colleagues also identified a gene for the syndrome. In 2006, his research group identified a single nucleotide polymorphism (SNP) in the ABCC11 gene is the determinant of human earwax type.

== Biography ==
Niikawa obtained his medical degree in 1967 from Hokkaido University School of Medicine. After residency in Pediatrics at Hokkaido University Hospital, he worked as a pediatrician in Japan for several years. From 1972 to 1975, Niikawa served as a research associate in the embryology and cytogenetics laboratory at the Department of Gynaecology and Obstetrics in the Cantonal Hospital, Geneva University.

From 1984 to 2007, Niikawa was Professor and Chairman of the Department of Human Genetics at Nagasaki University School of Medicine. He led several medical students and researchers, including Naomichi Matsumoto. After retiring from the position in Nagasaki and becoming Professor Emeritus in 2007, he became Professor and Director at the Research Institute of Personalized Health Sciences, Health Sciences University of Hokkaido, where he served as President of the university from 2010 to 2016.

== Awards and honors ==
- 2006 Prize for Science and Technology (Research Category), MEXT
- 2008 Academic Award, Japan Society of Human Genetics
