= KDM4C =

Protein-coding gene in the species Homo sapiens

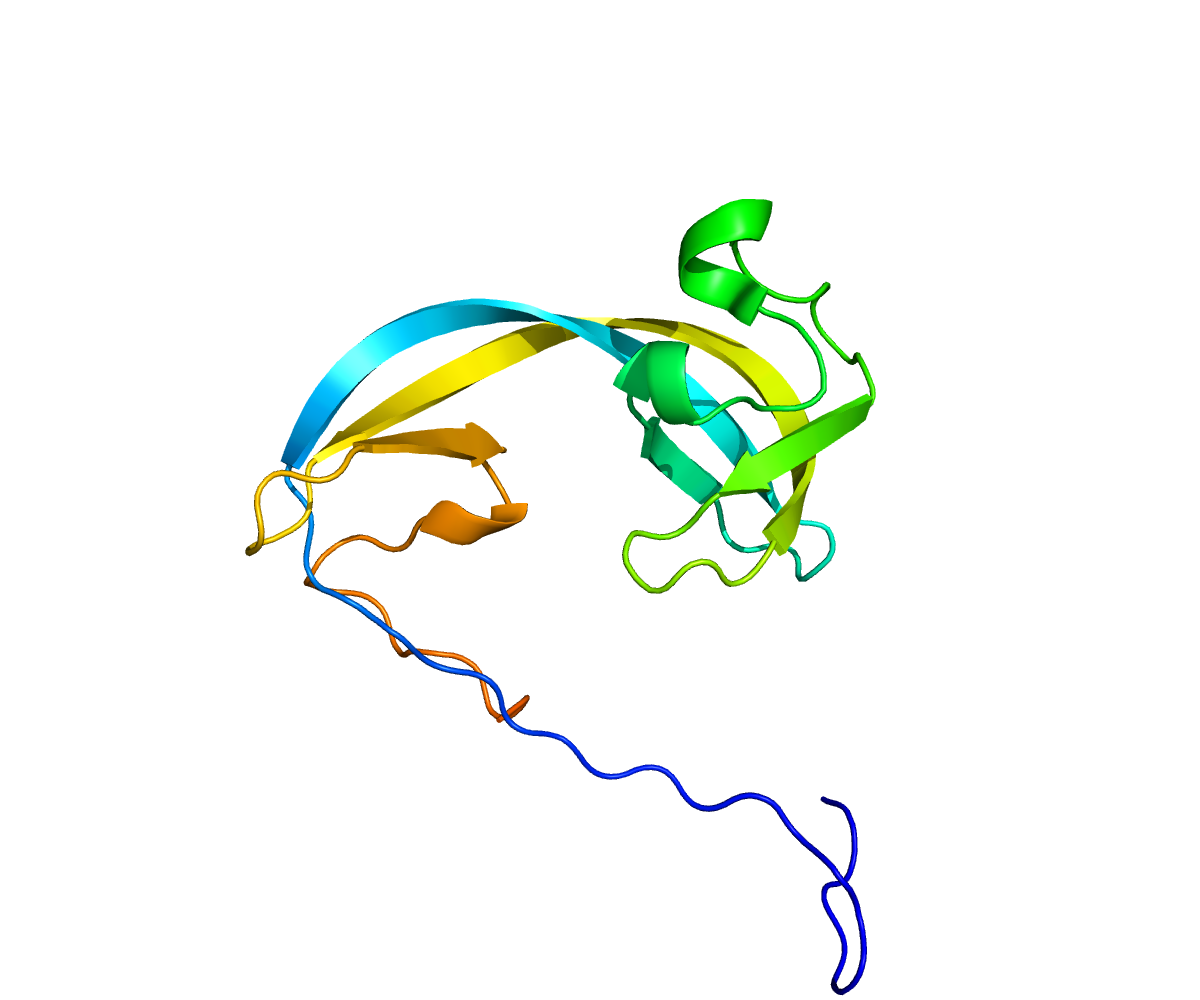

Identifiers
- Aliases: KDM4C, GASC1, JHDM3C, JMJD2C, TDRD14C, bA146B14.1, lysine demethylase 4C
- External IDs: OMIM: 605469; MGI: 1924054; GeneCards: KDM4C
Available structures
PDB	Ortholog search: PDBe RCSB
PDB	List of PDB id codes 2XDP, 2XML, 4XDO, 4XDP, 5FJK, 5FJH
Enzyme activity
EC #	BRENDA	ExPASy	KEGG	MetaCyc
1.14.11.66	↗	↗	↗	↗

Gene location (Human)
Chr.	Chromosome 9 (human)
Band	9p24.1	Start	6,720,863 bp
Band	9p24.1	End	7,175,648 bp

Gene location (Mouse)
Chr.	Chromosome 4 (mouse)
Band	4|4 C3	Start	74,160,734 bp
Band	4|4 C3	End	74,324,097 bp
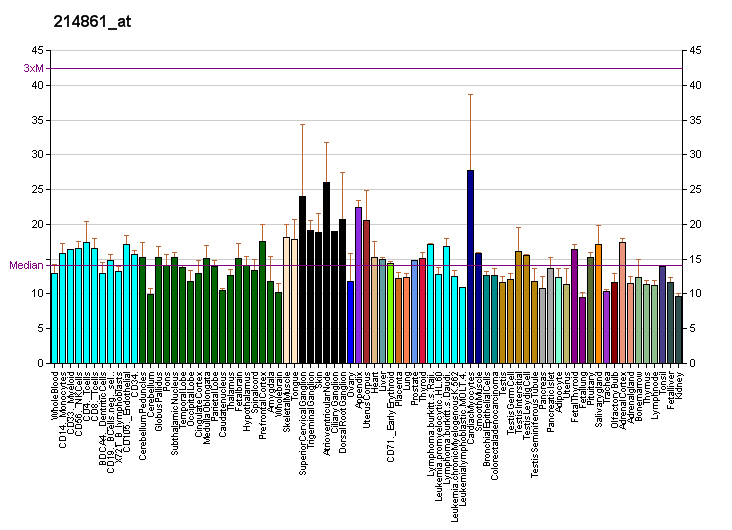

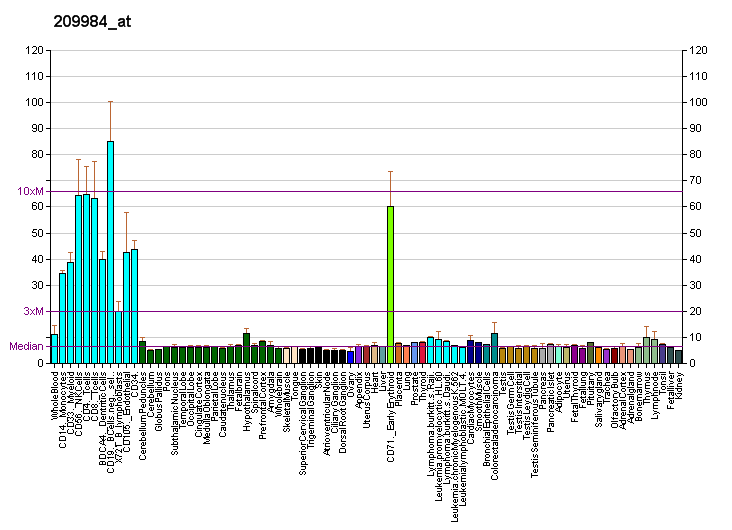
RNA expression pattern
Bgee	Human / Mouse (ortholog); Top expressed in: right hemisphere of cerebellum; epithelium of colon; bone marrow cell; tonsil; Achilles tendon; sural nerve; corpus callosum; body of pancreas; monocyte; granulocyte / Top expressed in: saccule; neural layer of retina; otic vesicle; otic placode; lacrimal gland; retinal pigment epithelium; granulocyte; interventricular septum; pineal gland; superior cervical ganglion; More reference expression data
BioGPS	More reference expression data
Gene ontology
Molecular function	oxidoreductase activity; histone H3-methyl-lysine-9 demethylase activity; dioxygenase activity; metal ion binding; chromatin binding; enzyme binding; histone demethylase activity; androgen receptor binding; zinc ion binding; histone H3-methyl-lysine-36 demethylase activity; DNA-binding transcription repressor activity, RNA polymerase II-specific; methylated histone binding
Cellular component	nucleus; nucleoplasm; pericentric heterochromatin; histone methyltransferase complex
Biological process	regulation of transcription by RNA polymerase II; regulation of transcription, DNA-templated; transcription, DNA-templated; positive regulation of cell population proliferation; blastocyst formation; regulation of gene expression; positive regulation of gene expression; histone H3-K9 demethylation; positive regulation of neuron differentiation; negative regulation of histone H3-K9 trimethylation; regulation of stem cell population maintenance; regulation of stem cell differentiation; histone H3-K36 demethylation; chromatin organization; negative regulation of transcription by RNA polymerase II; chromatin remodeling; stem cell population maintenance
Sources:Amigo / QuickGO
Orthologs
Databases	NCBI: entry; OMA: entry
Species	Human	Mouse
Entrez	23081	76804
Ensembl	ENSG00000107077	ENSMUSG00000028397
UniProt	Q9H3R0	Q8VCD7
RefSeq (mRNA)	NM_001146694; NM_001146695; NM_001146696; NM_001304339; NM_001304340 NM_001304341; NM_015061; NM_001353997; NM_001353998; NM_001353999; NM_001354000; NM_001354001	NM_001172095; NM_144787; NM_001356561
RefSeq (protein)	NP_001140167; NP_001140168; NP_001291268; NP_001291269; NP_001291270 NP_055876; NP_001340926; NP_001340927; NP_001340928; NP_001340929; NP_001340930	NP_001165566; NP_659036; NP_001343490
Location (UCSC)	Chr 9: 6.72 – 7.18 Mb	Chr 4: 74.16 – 74.32 Mb
PubMed search
- Wikidata
View/Edit Human	View/Edit Mouse

Lysine-specific demethylase 4C is an enzyme that in humans is encoded by the KDM4C gene.

== Structure ==
This gene is a member of the Jumonji domain 2 (JMJD2) family and encodes a protein with one JmjC domain, one JmjN domain, two PHD-type zinc fingers, and two Tudor domains. This nuclear protein belongs to the alpha-ketoglutarate-dependent hydroxylase superfamily.

== Function ==
It functions as a trimethylation-specific demethylase, converting specific trimethylated histone residues to the dimethylated form. Chromosomal aberrations and increased transcriptional expression of this gene are associated with esophageal squamous cell carcinoma. A expressional decrease of KDM4C was found during cardiac differentation of murine embryonic stem cells.
