= KDM1B =

Protein-coding gene in the species Homo sapiens

Identifiers
- Aliases: KDM1B, AOF1, C6orf193, LSD2, bA204B7.3, dJ298J15.2, lysine demethylase 1B
- External IDs: OMIM: 613081; MGI: 2145261; GeneCards: KDM1B
Available structures
| PDB | Ortholog search: PDBe RCSB |
| PDB | List of PDB id codes 4FWE, 4FWF, 4FWJ, 4GU0, 4GU1, 4GUR, 4GUS, 4GUT, 4GUU, 4HSU |
Enzyme activity
| EC # | BRENDA | ExPASy | KEGG | MetaCyc |
|---|---|---|---|---|
| 1.14.99.66 | ↗ | ↗ | ↗ | ↗ |

Gene location (Human)
| Chr. | Chromosome 6 (human) |
| Band | 6p22.3 | Start | 18,155,329 bp |
| Band | 6p22.3 | End | 18,223,854 bp |

Gene location (Mouse)
| Chr. | Chromosome 13 (mouse) |
| Band | 13|13 A5 | Start | 47,196,975 bp |
| Band | 13|13 A5 | End | 47,238,755 bp |
RNA expression pattern
| Bgee | Human / Mouse (ortholog); Top expressed in: secondary oocyte; monocyte; skin of arm; testicle; bronchial epithelial cell; islet of Langerhans; mucosa of ileum; bone marrow; ganglionic eminence; right lobe of thyroid gland / Top expressed in: primary oocyte; zygote; secondary oocyte; parotid gland; transitional epithelium of urinary bladder; lacrimal gland; lobe of prostate; Gonadal ridge; skin of external ear; seminal vesicula; More reference expression data |
| BioGPS | n/a |
Gene ontology
| Molecular function | metal ion binding; DNA binding; oxidoreductase activity; flavin adenine dinucleotide binding; histone demethylase activity; protein binding; zinc ion binding; histone binding; FAD binding |
| Cellular component | nucleus; nucleoplasm; nucleosome |
| Biological process | multicellular organism development; regulation of transcription, DNA-templated; regulation of gene expression by genetic imprinting; regulation of DNA methylation; transcription, DNA-templated; DNA methylation involved in gamete generation; protein deubiquitination; histone H3-K4 demethylation; chromatin organization |
Sources:Amigo / QuickGO
Orthologs
| Databases | NCBI: entry; OMA: entry |
| Species | Human | Mouse |
| Entrez | 221656 | 218214 |
| Ensembl | ENSG00000165097 | ENSMUSG00000038080 |
| UniProt | Q8NB78 | Q8CIG3 |
| RefSeq (mRNA) | NM_153042; NM_001364614 | NM_172262 |
| RefSeq (protein) | NP_694587; NP_001351543 | NP_758466; NP_001389837; NP_001389838 |
| Location (UCSC) | Chr 6: 18.16 – 18.22 Mb | Chr 13: 47.2 – 47.24 Mb |
| PubMed search |
- Wikidata
| View/Edit Human | View/Edit Mouse |

Lysine (K)-specific demethylase 1B is a protein that in humans is encoded by the KDM1B gene.

== Function ==
Flavin-dependent histone demethylases, such as KDM1B, regulate histone lysine methylation, an epigenetic mark that regulates gene expression and chromatin function.
