= UTY (gene) =

Protein-coding gene in the species Homo sapiens

Identifiers
- Aliases: UTY, KDM6AL, UTY1, ubiquitously transcribed tetratricopeptide repeat containing, Y-linked, KDM6C
- External IDs: OMIM: 400009; GeneCards: UTY
Available structures
PDB	Human UniProt search: PDBe RCSB
PDB	List of PDB id codes 3ZLI, 3ZPO, 4UF0, 5FY0, 5FXW, 5FXX, 5FXZ, 5FY1, 5FY7, 5FYM, 5FXV, 5A1L
Enzyme activity
EC #	BRENDA	ExPASy	KEGG	MetaCyc
1.14.11.68	↗	↗	↗	↗

Gene location (Human)
Chr.	Y chromosome (human)
Band	Yq11.221	Start	13,234,577 bp
Band	Yq11.221	End	13,480,673 bp
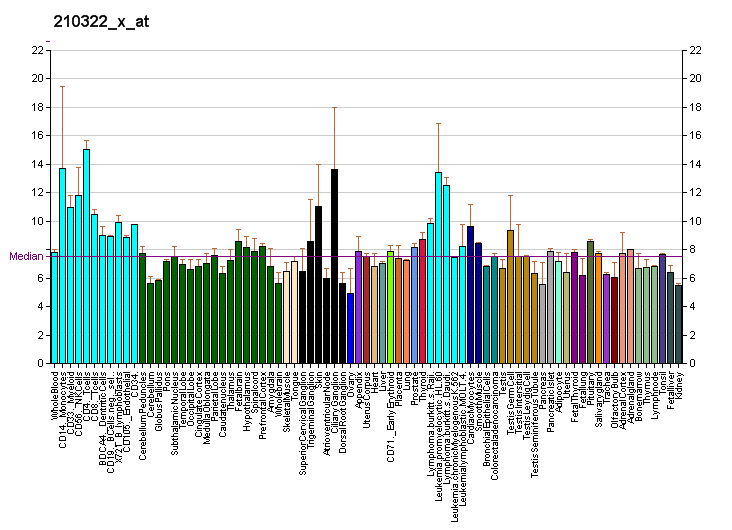

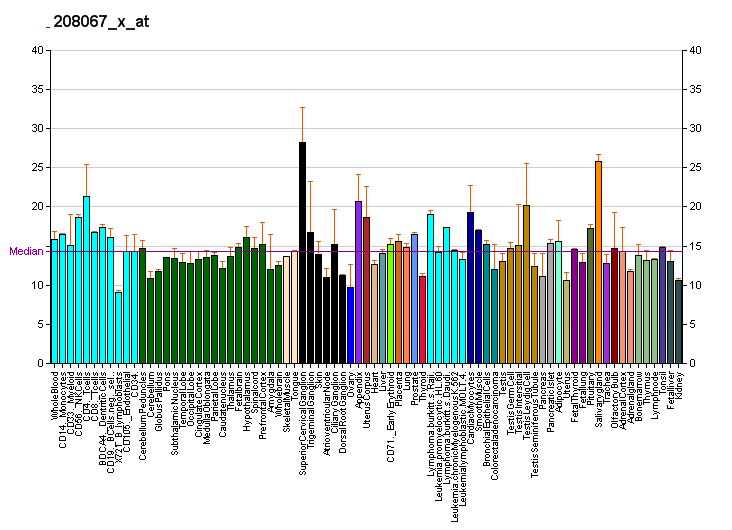

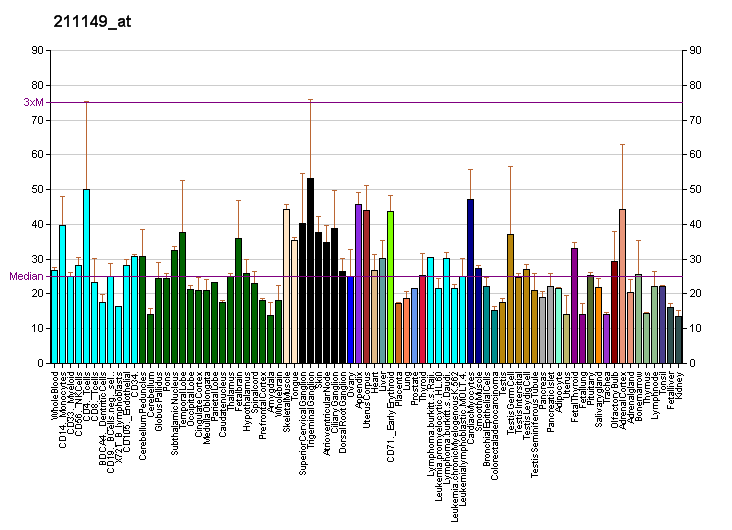
RNA expression pattern
Bgee	Human / Mouse (ortholog); Top expressed in: gonad; corpus callosum; testicle; tendon of biceps brachii; rectum; right lung; prostate; cartilage tissue; corpus epididymis; middle frontal gyrus / n/a; More reference expression data
BioGPS	More reference expression data
Gene ontology
Molecular function	oxidoreductase activity; dioxygenase activity; histone H3-tri/di-methyl-lysine-27 demethylase activity; metal ion binding; histone demethylase activity; RNA polymerase II cis-regulatory region sequence-specific DNA binding; chromatin binding; chromatin DNA binding; sequence-specific DNA binding
Cellular component	nucleus; nucleoplasm; MLL3/4 complex
Biological process	regulation of gene expression; histone H3-K27 demethylation; chromatin organization
Sources:Amigo / QuickGO
Orthologs
Databases	NCBI: entry; OMA: entry
Species	Human	Mouse
Entrez	7404	n/a
Ensembl	ENSG00000183878	n/a
UniProt	O14607	n/a
RefSeq (mRNA)	NM_001258249; NM_001258250; NM_001258251; NM_001258252; NM_001258253 NM_001258254; NM_001258255; NM_001258256; NM_001258257; NM_001258258; NM_001258259; NM_001258260; NM_001258261; NM_001258262; NM_001258263; NM_001258264; NM_001258265; NM_001258266; NM_001258267; NM_001258268; NM_001258269; NM_001258270; NM_007125; NM_182659; NM_182660; NM_001400170; NM_001400171; NM_001400173; NM_001400175; NM_001400177; NM_001400178; NM_001400181; NM_001400183; NM_001400185; NM_001400187; NM_001400189; NM_001400192; NM_001400195; NM_001400199	n/a
RefSeq (protein)	NP_001245178; NP_001245179; NP_001245180; NP_001245181; NP_001245182 NP_001245183; NP_001245184; NP_001245185; NP_001245186; NP_001245187; NP_001245188; NP_001245189; NP_001245190; NP_001245191; NP_001245192; NP_001245193; NP_001245194; NP_001245195; NP_001245196; NP_001245197; NP_001245198; NP_001245199; NP_009056; NP_872600; NP_872601; NP_001245196.1; NP_001245192.1; NP_001245178.1; NP_001245194.1; NP_001245186.1; NP_001245191.1; NP_001245187.1	n/a
Location (UCSC)	Chr Y: 13.23 – 13.48 Mb	n/a
PubMed search		n/a
- Wikidata
View/Edit Human

Histone demethylase UTY, or Ubiquitously transcribed tetratricopeptide repeat, Y chromosome, is an enzyme that in humans is encoded by the UTY gene.

This gene encodes a protein containing tetratricopeptide repeats which are thought to be involved in protein–protein interactions. This protein is a minor histocompatibility antigen which may induce graft rejection of male stem cell grafts. Alternative splicing results in multiple transcript variants encoding different isoforms.

The X-chromosome version of this gene is called KDM6A (UTX).

== Interactions ==
UTY has been shown to interact with TLE1 and WDR90.
