= KDM3B =

Protein-coding gene in the species Homo sapiens

Identifiers
- Aliases: KDM3B, 5qNCA, C5orf7, JMJD1B, NET22, lysine demethylase 3B, DIJOS
- External IDs: OMIM: 609373; MGI: 1923356; GeneCards: KDM3B
Available structures
PDB	Ortholog search: PDBe RCSB
PDB	List of PDB id codes 4C8D
Enzyme activity
EC #	BRENDA	ExPASy	KEGG	MetaCyc
1.14.11.65	↗	↗	↗	↗

Gene location (Human)
Chr.	Chromosome 5 (human)
Band	5q31.2	Start	138,352,685 bp
Band	5q31.2	End	138,437,028 bp

Gene location (Mouse)
Chr.	Chromosome 18 (mouse)
Band	18|18 B1	Start	34,910,100 bp
Band	18|18 B1	End	34,971,713 bp
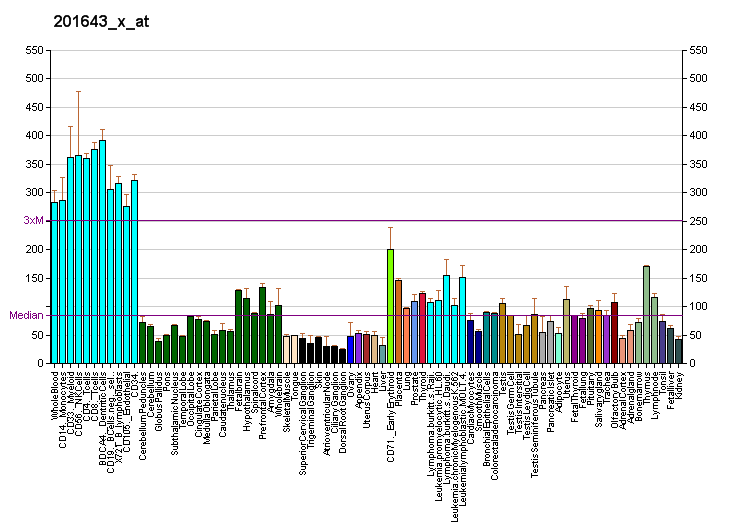

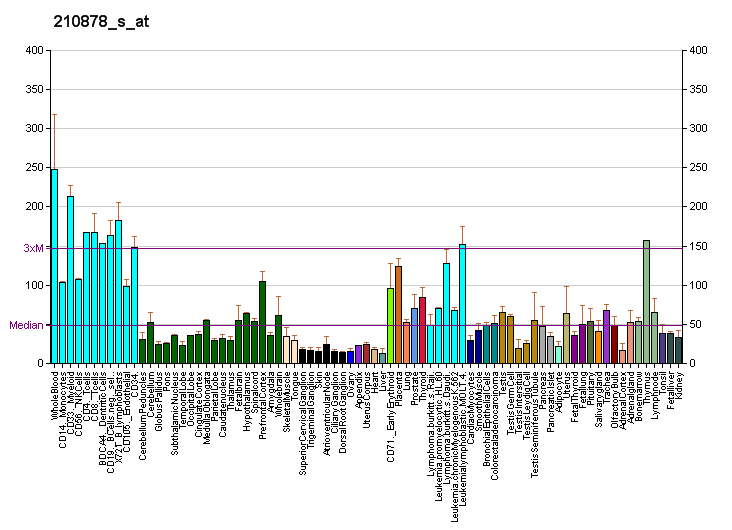
RNA expression pattern
Bgee	Human / Mouse (ortholog); Top expressed in: ventricular zone; ganglionic eminence; glutes; monocyte; caput epididymis; gastric mucosa; mucosa of ileum; gastrocnemius muscle; tibialis anterior muscle; saphenous vein / Top expressed in: tail of embryo; neural layer of retina; genital tubercle; granulocyte; tibiofemoral joint; ventricular zone; renal corpuscle; right ventricle; thymus; corneal stroma; More reference expression data
BioGPS	More reference expression data
Gene ontology
Molecular function	oxidoreductase activity; antioxidant activity; dioxygenase activity; metal ion binding; histone demethylase activity; transcription cis-regulatory region binding; chromatin DNA binding; histone H3-methyl-lysine-9 demethylase activity
Cellular component	chromatin; nucleus; nucleoplasm
Biological process	cellular oxidant detoxification; response to cisplatin; transcription, DNA-templated; regulation of transcription, DNA-templated; histone H3-K9 demethylation; chromatin organization
Sources:Amigo / QuickGO
Orthologs
Databases	NCBI: entry; OMA: entry
Species	Human	Mouse
Entrez	51780	277250
Ensembl	ENSG00000120733	ENSMUSG00000038773
UniProt	Q7LBC6	Q6ZPY7
RefSeq (mRNA)	NM_016604	NM_001081256; NM_029518
RefSeq (protein)	NP_057688	NP_001074725
Location (UCSC)	Chr 5: 138.35 – 138.44 Mb	Chr 18: 34.91 – 34.97 Mb
PubMed search
- Wikidata
View/Edit Human	View/Edit Mouse

Lysine-specific demethylase 3B is an enzyme that in humans is encoded by the KDM3B gene. KDM3B belongs to the alpha-ketoglutarate-dependent hydroxylase superfamily.
