= KDM3A =

Protein-coding gene in the species Homo sapiens

Identifiers
- Aliases: KDM3A, JHDM2A, JHMD2A, JMJD1, JMJD1A, TSGA, lysine demethylase 3A
- External IDs: OMIM: 611512; MGI: 98847; GeneCards: KDM3A
Enzyme activity
EC #	BRENDA	ExPASy	KEGG	MetaCyc
1.14.11.65	↗	↗	↗	↗

Gene location (Human)
Chr.	Chromosome 2 (human)
Band	2p11.2	Start	86,440,647 bp
Band	2p11.2	End	86,492,716 bp

Gene location (Mouse)
Chr.	Chromosome 6 (mouse)
Band	6|6 C1	Start	71,565,956 bp
Band	6|6 C1	End	71,609,974 bp
RNA expression pattern
Bgee	Human / Mouse (ortholog); Top expressed in: secondary oocyte; Achilles tendon; sperm; ventricular zone; sural nerve; skin of thigh; skin of abdomen; skin of hip; left testis; right testis / Top expressed in: spermatocyte; spermatid; tail of embryo; genital tubercle; ventricular zone; Gonadal ridge; seminiferous tubule; neural layer of retina; left lung lobe; ganglionic eminence; More reference expression data
BioGPS	n/a
Gene ontology
Molecular function	iron ion binding; DNA-binding transcription factor activity; dioxygenase activity; metal ion binding; androgen receptor binding; oxidoreductase activity; histone demethylase activity; transcription cis-regulatory region binding; chromatin DNA binding; histone H3-methyl-lysine-9 demethylase activity; protein binding; RNA polymerase II core promoter sequence-specific DNA binding
Cellular component	cytoplasm; membrane; nucleoplasm; nucleus; chromatin
Biological process	androgen receptor signaling pathway; cell differentiation; regulation of transcription, DNA-templated; histone H3-K9 dimethylation; regulation of stem cell differentiation; regulation of stem cell population maintenance; transcription, DNA-templated; positive regulation of transcription, DNA-templated; spermatogenesis; hormone-mediated signaling pathway; negative regulation of histone H3-K9 methylation; regulation of gene expression; formaldehyde biosynthetic process; spermatid nucleus elongation; positive regulation of transcription by RNA polymerase II; histone H3-K9 demethylation; cellular response to leukemia inhibitory factor; chromatin organization; positive regulation of cold-induced thermogenesis
Sources:Amigo / QuickGO
Orthologs
Databases	NCBI: entry; OMA: entry
Species	Human	Mouse
Entrez	55818	104263
Ensembl	ENSG00000115548	ENSMUSG00000053470
UniProt	Q9Y4C1	Q6PCM1
RefSeq (mRNA)	NM_001146688; NM_018433	NM_001038695; NM_173001; NM_001362200; NM_001362201
RefSeq (protein)	NP_001140160; NP_060903	NP_001033784; NP_766589; NP_001349129; NP_001349130
Location (UCSC)	Chr 2: 86.44 – 86.49 Mb	Chr 6: 71.57 – 71.61 Mb
PubMed search
- Wikidata
View/Edit Human	View/Edit Mouse

Lysine demethylase 3A is a protein that in humans is encoded by the KDM3A gene.

== Function ==
This gene encodes a zinc finger protein that contains a jumonji C (JmjC) domain and may play a role in hormone-dependent transcriptional activation. Alternative splicing results in multiple transcript variants. KDM3A catalyzes the demethylation of H3K9me1 and H3K9me2 residues. Its function is dependent on the presence of cofactors Fe(II) and α-Ketoglutarate.
