= KDM4B =

Protein-coding gene in the species Homo sapiens

Identifiers
- Aliases: KDM4B, JMJD2B, TDRD14B, lysine demethylase 4B, MRD65
- External IDs: OMIM: 609765; MGI: 2442355; GeneCards: KDM4B
Available structures
PDB	Ortholog search: PDBe RCSB
PDB	List of PDB id codes 4LXL, 4UC4
Enzyme activity
EC #	BRENDA	ExPASy	KEGG	MetaCyc
1.14.11.66	↗	↗	↗	↗

Gene location (Human)
Chr.	Chromosome 19 (human)
Band	19p13.3	Start	4,969,113 bp
Band	19p13.3	End	5,153,598 bp

Gene location (Mouse)
Chr.	Chromosome 17 (mouse)
Band	17|17 D	Start	56,633,062 bp
Band	17|17 D	End	56,709,870 bp
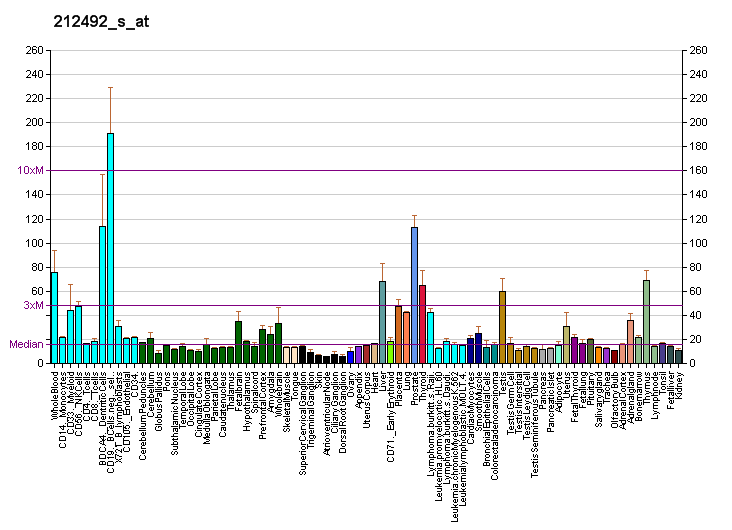

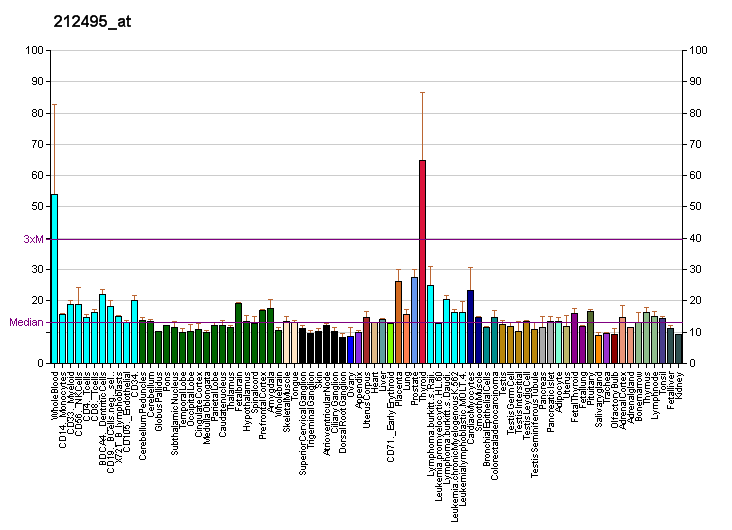

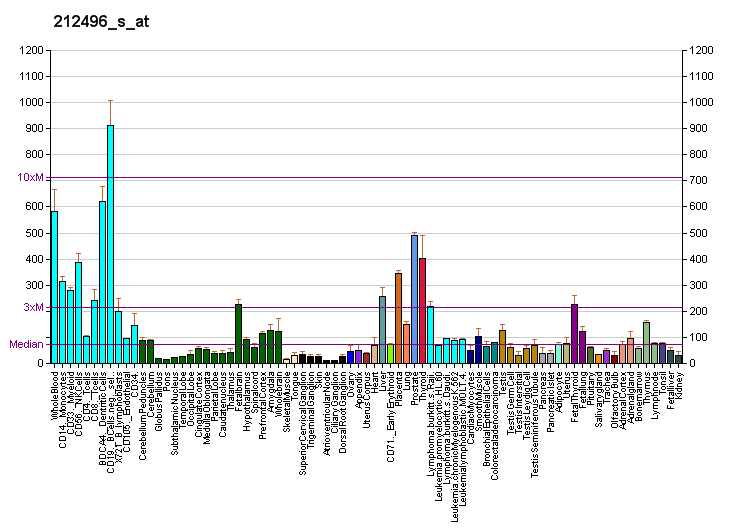
RNA expression pattern
Bgee	Human / Mouse (ortholog); Top expressed in: dorsal motor nucleus of vagus nerve; corpus epididymis; blood; caput epididymis; inferior olivary nucleus; sural nerve; parotid gland; tendon of biceps brachii; nipple; Skeletal muscle tissue of biceps brachii / Top expressed in: Rostral migratory stream; lip; neural layer of retina; superior frontal gyrus; otic vesicle; primary visual cortex; external carotid artery; dentate gyrus of hippocampal formation granule cell; granulocyte; muscle of thigh; More reference expression data
BioGPS	More reference expression data
Gene ontology
Molecular function	oxidoreductase activity; dioxygenase activity; metal ion binding; histone demethylase activity; histone H3-methyl-lysine-36 demethylase activity; histone H3-methyl-lysine-9 demethylase activity; DNA-binding transcription repressor activity, RNA polymerase II-specific; chromatin binding; methylated histone binding
Cellular component	nucleoplasm; nucleus; histone methyltransferase complex
Biological process	regulation of transcription, DNA-templated; transcription, DNA-templated; histone H3-K36 demethylation; histone H3-K9 demethylation; chromatin organization; negative regulation of transcription by RNA polymerase II; chromatin remodeling
Sources:Amigo / QuickGO
Orthologs
Databases	NCBI: entry; OMA: entry
Species	Human	Mouse
Entrez	23030	193796
Ensembl	ENSG00000127663	ENSMUSG00000024201
UniProt	O94953	Q91VY5
RefSeq (mRNA)	NM_015015; NM_001370093; NM_001370094	NM_172132; NM_001357909
RefSeq (protein)	NP_055830; NP_001357022; NP_001357023	NP_742144; NP_001344838
Location (UCSC)	Chr 19: 4.97 – 5.15 Mb	Chr 17: 56.63 – 56.71 Mb
PubMed search
- Wikidata
View/Edit Human	View/Edit Mouse

Lysine-specific demethylase 4B is an enzyme that in humans is encoded by the KDM4B gene. KDM4B belongs to the alpha-ketoglutarate-dependent hydroxylase superfamily.
