= KDM4D =

Protein-coding gene in the species Homo sapiens

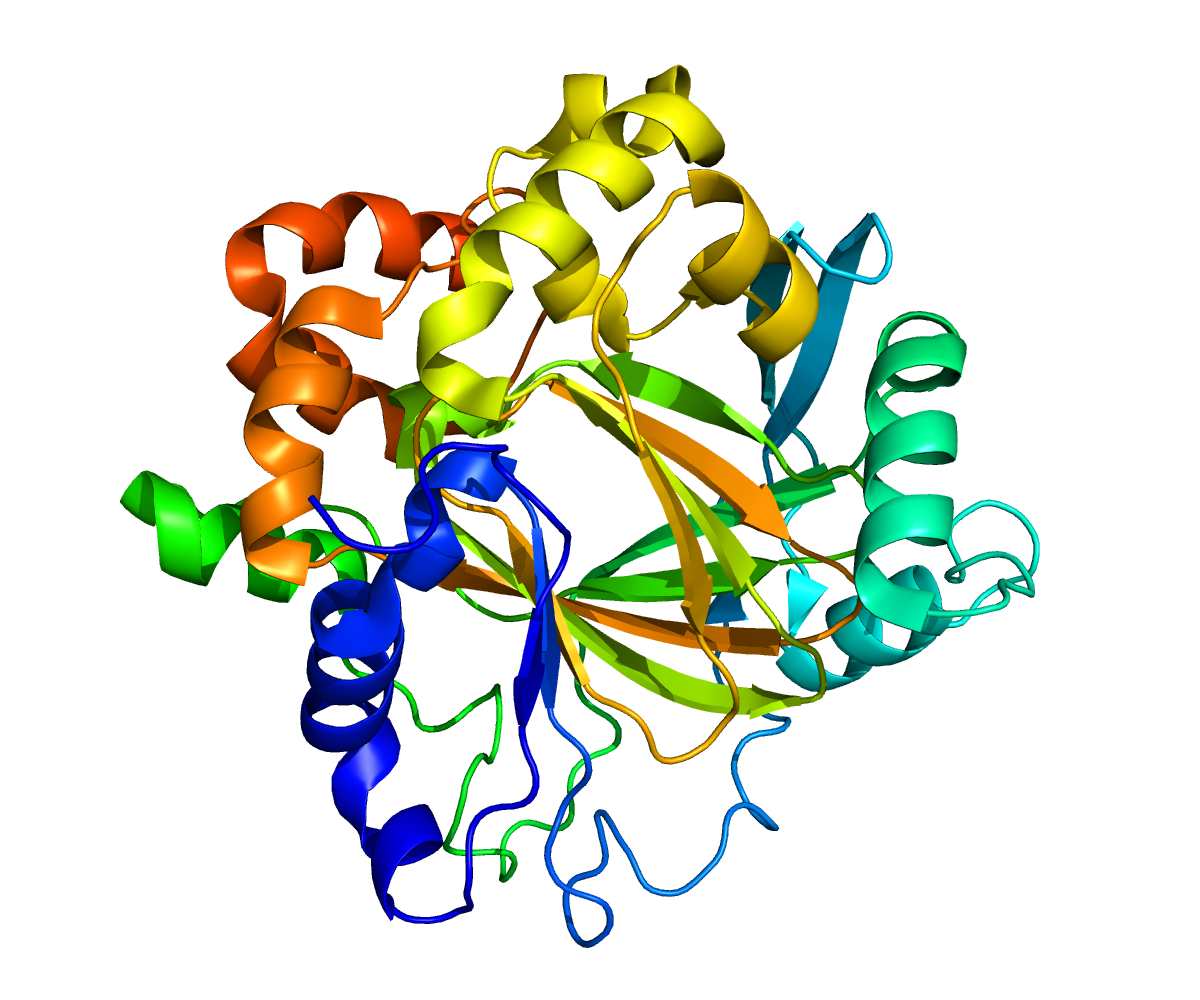

Identifiers
- Aliases: KDM4D, JMJD2D, lysine demethylase 4D
- External IDs: OMIM: 609766; MGI: 3606484; GeneCards: KDM4D
Available structures
PDB	Ortholog search: PDBe RCSB
PDB	List of PDB id codes 3DXT, 3DXU, 4D6Q, 4D6R, 4D6S, 4HON, 4HOO, 5FP9, 5F5A, 5FP8, 5FPA, 5FPB, 5FP4, 5F5C
Enzyme activity
EC #	BRENDA	ExPASy	KEGG	MetaCyc
1.14.11.66	↗	↗	↗	↗

Gene location (Human)
Chr.	Chromosome 11 (human)
Band	11q21	Start	94,973,709 bp
Band	11q21	End	94,999,519 bp

Gene location (Mouse)
Chr.	Chromosome 9 (mouse)
Band	9|9 A1- A2	Start	14,373,844 bp
Band	9|9 A1- A2	End	14,411,778 bp
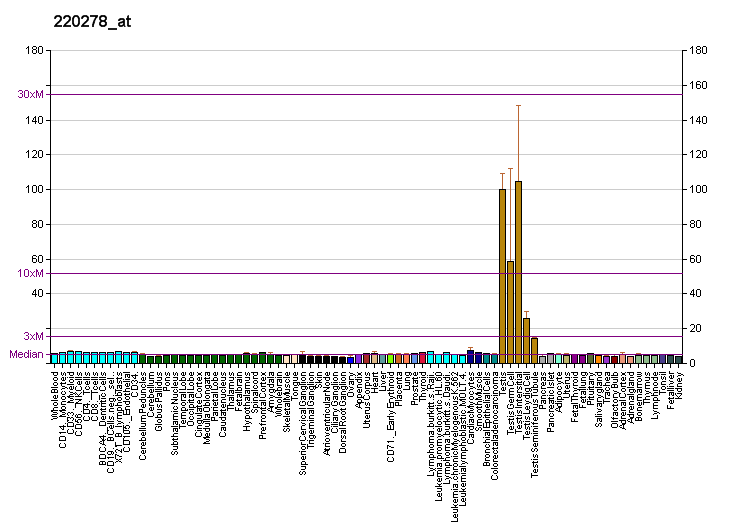
RNA expression pattern
Bgee	Human / Mouse (ortholog); Top expressed in: buccal mucosa cell; left testis; right testis; testicle; gonad; sperm; secondary oocyte; ventricular zone; islet of Langerhans; stromal cell of endometrium / Top expressed in: spermatocyte; seminiferous tubule; spermatid; lumbar spinal ganglion; embryo; lumbar subsegment of spinal cord; facial motor nucleus; primary visual cortex; superior frontal gyrus; neural layer of retina; More reference expression data
BioGPS	More reference expression data
Gene ontology
Molecular function	oxidoreductase activity; dioxygenase activity; metal ion binding; histone demethylase activity; histone H3-methyl-lysine-9 demethylase activity; DNA-binding transcription repressor activity, RNA polymerase II-specific; chromatin binding; damaged DNA binding; chromatin DNA binding; methylated histone binding
Cellular component	blood microparticle; nucleus; nucleoplasm; site of double-strand break; pericentric heterochromatin; histone methyltransferase complex
Biological process	regulation of protein phosphorylation; cellular response to ionizing radiation; regulation of transcription, DNA-templated; positive regulation of chromatin binding; double-strand break repair via homologous recombination; transcription, DNA-templated; positive regulation of double-strand break repair via nonhomologous end joining; histone H3-K9 demethylation; negative regulation of transcription by RNA polymerase II; chromatin organization; cellular response to DNA damage stimulus; negative regulation of histone H3-K9 trimethylation; chromatin remodeling
Sources:Amigo / QuickGO
Orthologs
Databases	NCBI: entry; OMA: entry
Species	Human	Mouse
Entrez	55693	244694
Ensembl	ENSG00000186280	ENSMUSG00000053914
UniProt	Q6B0I6	Q3U2K5
RefSeq (mRNA)	NM_018039	NM_173433
RefSeq (protein)	NP_060509	NP_775609
Location (UCSC)	Chr 11: 94.97 – 95 Mb	Chr 9: 14.37 – 14.41 Mb
PubMed search
- Wikidata
View/Edit Human	View/Edit Mouse

Lysine-specific demethylase 4D is an enzyme that in humans is encoded by the KDM4D gene. KDM4D belongs to the alpha-ketoglutarate-dependent hydroxylase superfamily.

In 2017, messenger RNA from this gene was used in the somatic cell nuclear transfer experiment that produced the first two cloned primates from post-embryonic donor material. A similar experiment was carried out to increase the cloning efficiency of bovine species in 2018.
