= Lysine-specific demethylase 6A =

Protein-coding gene in humans

KDM6A

Identifiers
- Aliases: KDM6A, KABUK2, UTX, bA386N14.2, lysine demethylase 6A
- External IDs: OMIM: 300128; MGI: 1095419; GeneCards: KDM6A
Available structures
PDB	Ortholog search: PDBe RCSB
PDB	List of PDB id codes 3AVR, 3AVS
Enzyme activity
EC #	BRENDA	ExPASy	KEGG	MetaCyc
1.14.11.68	↗	↗	↗	↗

Gene location (Human)
Chr.	X chromosome (human)
Band	Xp11.3	Start	44,873,188 bp
Band	Xp11.3	End	45,112,779 bp

Gene location (Mouse)
Chr.	X chromosome (mouse)
Band	X A1.2- A1.3|X 13.45 cM	Start	18,028,814 bp
Band	X A1.2- A1.3|X 13.45 cM	End	18,146,175 bp
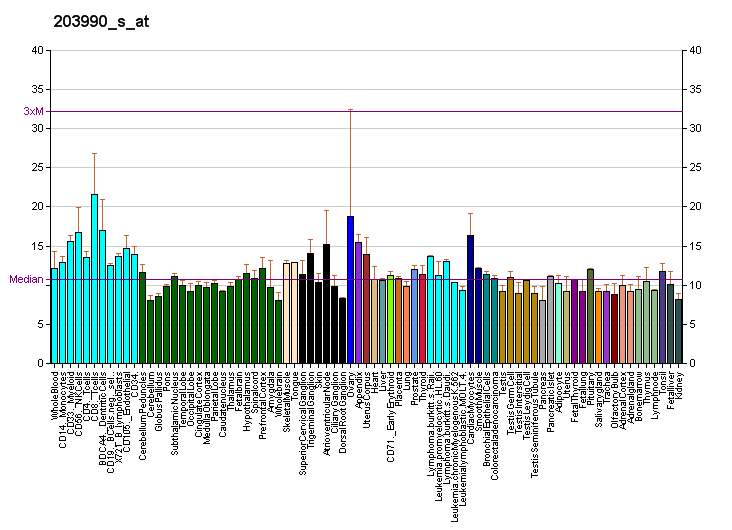

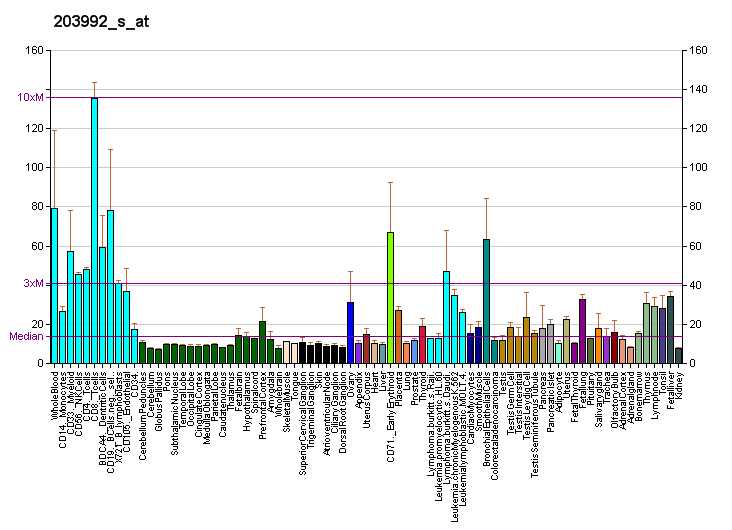

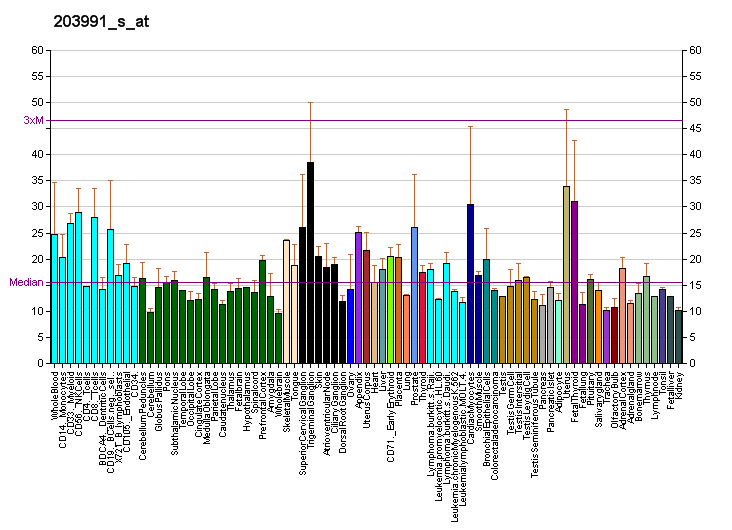
RNA expression pattern
Bgee	Human / Mouse (ortholog); Top expressed in: secondary oocyte; bone marrow cell; left ovary; monocyte; skin of abdomen; germinal epithelium; ectocervix; vagina; epithelium of colon; skin of leg / Top expressed in: zygote; secondary oocyte; genital tubercle; primary oocyte; internal carotid artery; tail of embryo; lacrimal gland; Rostral migratory stream; maxillary prominence; external carotid artery; More reference expression data
BioGPS	More reference expression data
Gene ontology
Molecular function	dioxygenase activity; metal ion binding; RNA polymerase II cis-regulatory region sequence-specific DNA binding; identical protein binding; oxidoreductase activity; chromatin DNA binding; histone H3-tri/di-methyl-lysine-27 demethylase activity; histone demethylase activity; chromatin binding; sequence-specific DNA binding
Cellular component	nucleoplasm; MLL3/4 complex; histone methyltransferase complex; nucleus
Biological process	respiratory system process; histone H3-K27 demethylation; multicellular organism growth; embryonic organ development; somite rostral/caudal axis specification; heart morphogenesis; in utero embryonic development; development of the heart; histone H3-K4 methylation; neural tube closure; positive regulation of gene expression; notochord morphogenesis; neural tube development; mesodermal cell differentiation; canonical Wnt signaling pathway; regulation of gene expression; chromatin remodeling; chromatin organization
Sources:Amigo / QuickGO
Orthologs
Databases	NCBI: entry; OMA: entry
Species	Human	Mouse
Entrez	7403	22289
Ensembl	ENSG00000147050	ENSMUSG00000037369
UniProt	O15550	O70546
RefSeq (mRNA)	NM_001291415; NM_001291416; NM_001291417; NM_001291418; NM_001291421 NM_021140	NM_009483; NM_001310444
RefSeq (protein)	NP_001278344; NP_001278345; NP_001278346; NP_001278347; NP_001278350 NP_066963	NP_001297373; NP_033509; NP_001390300; NP_001390301; NP_001390302 NP_001390303; NP_001390304; NP_001390305; NP_001390306; NP_001390307; NP_001390308; NP_001390309; NP_001390310
Location (UCSC)	Chr X: 44.87 – 45.11 Mb	Chr X: 18.03 – 18.15 Mb
PubMed search
- Wikidata
View/Edit Human	View/Edit Mouse

Lysine-specific demethylase 6A also known as Ubiquitously transcribed tetratricopeptide repeat, X chromosome (UTX), is a protein which in humans is encoded by the KDM6A gene. It belongs to the 2-oxoglutarate (2OG)-dependent dioxygenase superfamily.

The Y-chromosome version of this gene is called UTY.

== Function ==
UTX has been linked with demethylation of lysine residues on histone, in particular H3K27, resulting in a gene derepression, a potential means of regulating cellular metabolism.

== See also ==
- Demethylase
  - Demethylation
- Dioxygenase
- Histone
  - Histone H3
- Lysine
- 2-Oxoglutarate
- Tetratricopeptide repeat
