= Microcephaly =

Condition in which the head is small due to an underdeveloped brain

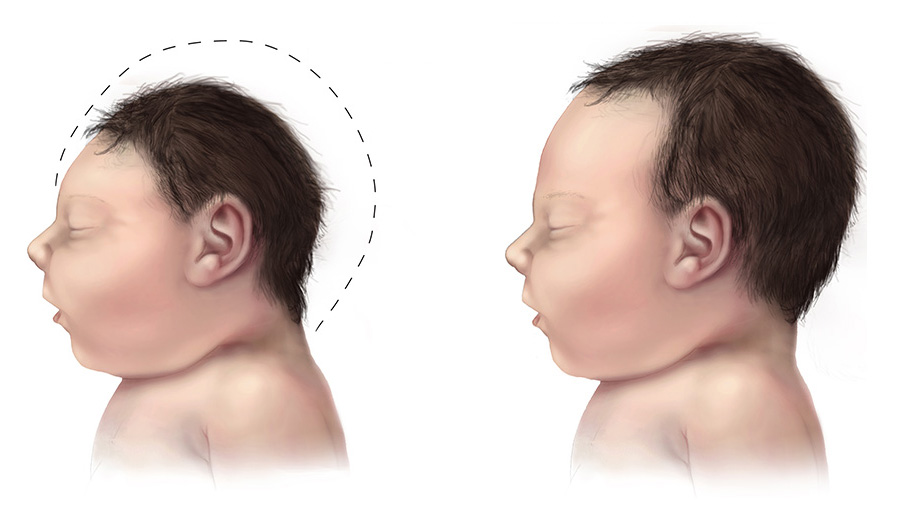
- A baby with microcephaly (left) compared to a baby with a typical head size
- Pronunciation: /ˌmaɪkroʊˈsɛfəliː/
- Specialty: Medical genetics, psychiatry, neurology
- Symptoms: Abnormally small head and brain, neurological impairments
- Complications: Neurological impairments
- Usual onset: Congenital
- Duration: Lifelong
- Causes: Usually genetic or toxin exposure during pregnancy
- Prevention: Avoiding alcohol consumption while pregnant
- Frequency: 2–12 per 10,000 births

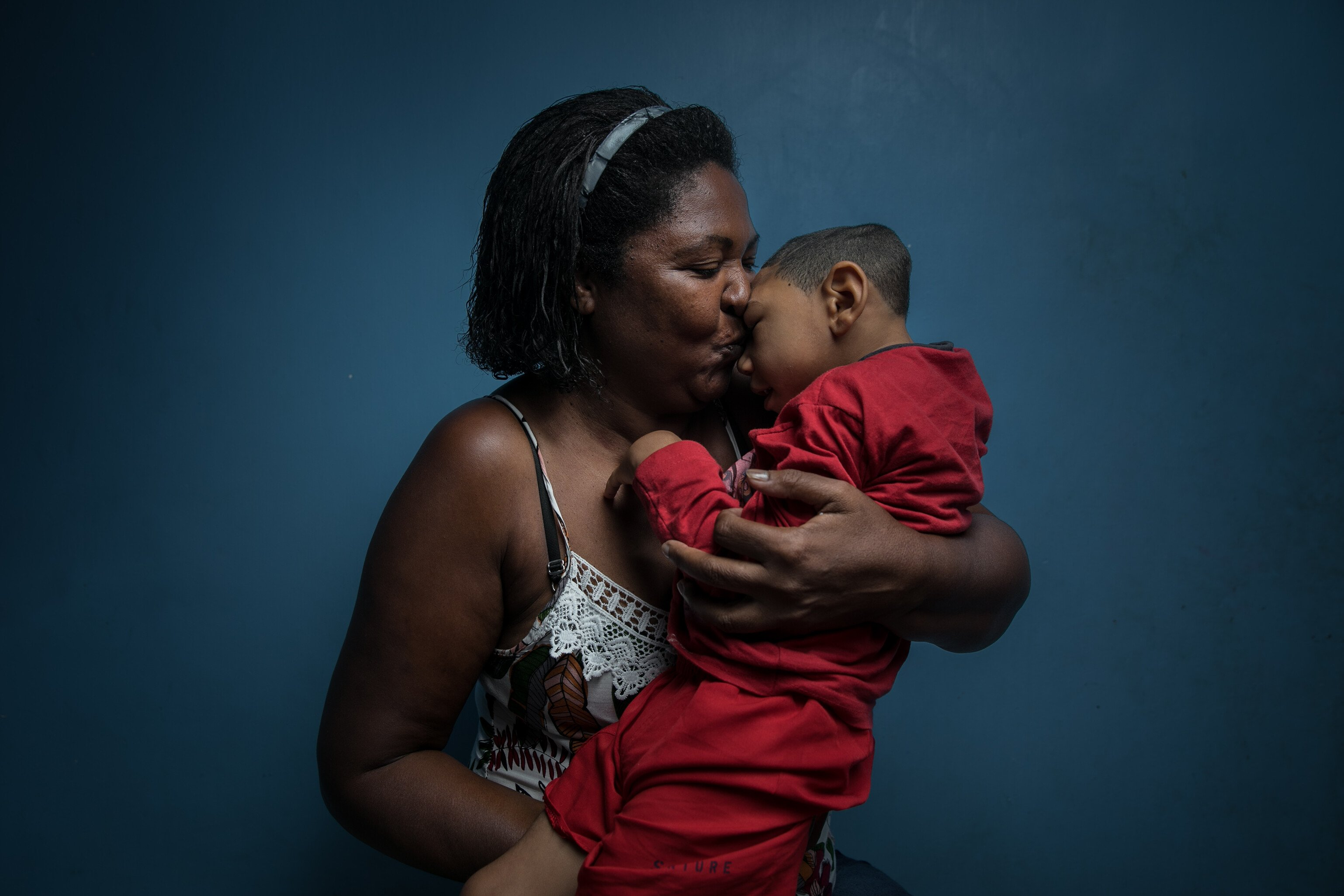
A mother holding her son who was born with microcephaly due to vertically transmitted infection with Zika virus

Microcephaly (from Neo-Latin microcephalia, from Ancient Greek μικρός mikrós "small" and κεφαλή kephalé "head") is a medical condition involving a smaller-than-normal head. Microcephaly may be present at birth or it may develop in the first few years of life. Brain development is often affected; people with this disorder often have an intellectual disability, poor motor function, poor speech, abnormal facial features, seizures and dwarfism.

The disorder is caused by a disruption to the genetic processes that form the brain early in pregnancy, though the cause is not identified in most cases. Many genetic syndromes can result in microcephaly, including chromosomal and single-gene conditions, though almost always in combination with other symptoms. Mutations that result solely in microcephaly (primary microcephaly) exist but are less common. External toxins to the embryo, such as alcohol during pregnancy or vertically transmitted infections, can also result in microcephaly. Microcephaly serves as an important neurological indication or warning sign, but no uniformity exists in its definition. It is usually defined as a head circumference more than two standard deviations below the mean for age and sex. Some academics advocate defining it as head circumference more than three standard deviations below the mean for the age and sex.

There is no specific treatment that returns the head size to normal. In general, life expectancy for individuals with microcephaly is reduced, and the prognosis for normal brain function is poor. Occasional cases develop normal intelligence and grow normally (apart from persistently small head circumference). It is reported that in the United States, microcephaly occurs in 1 in 800–5,000 births.

== Signs and symptoms ==
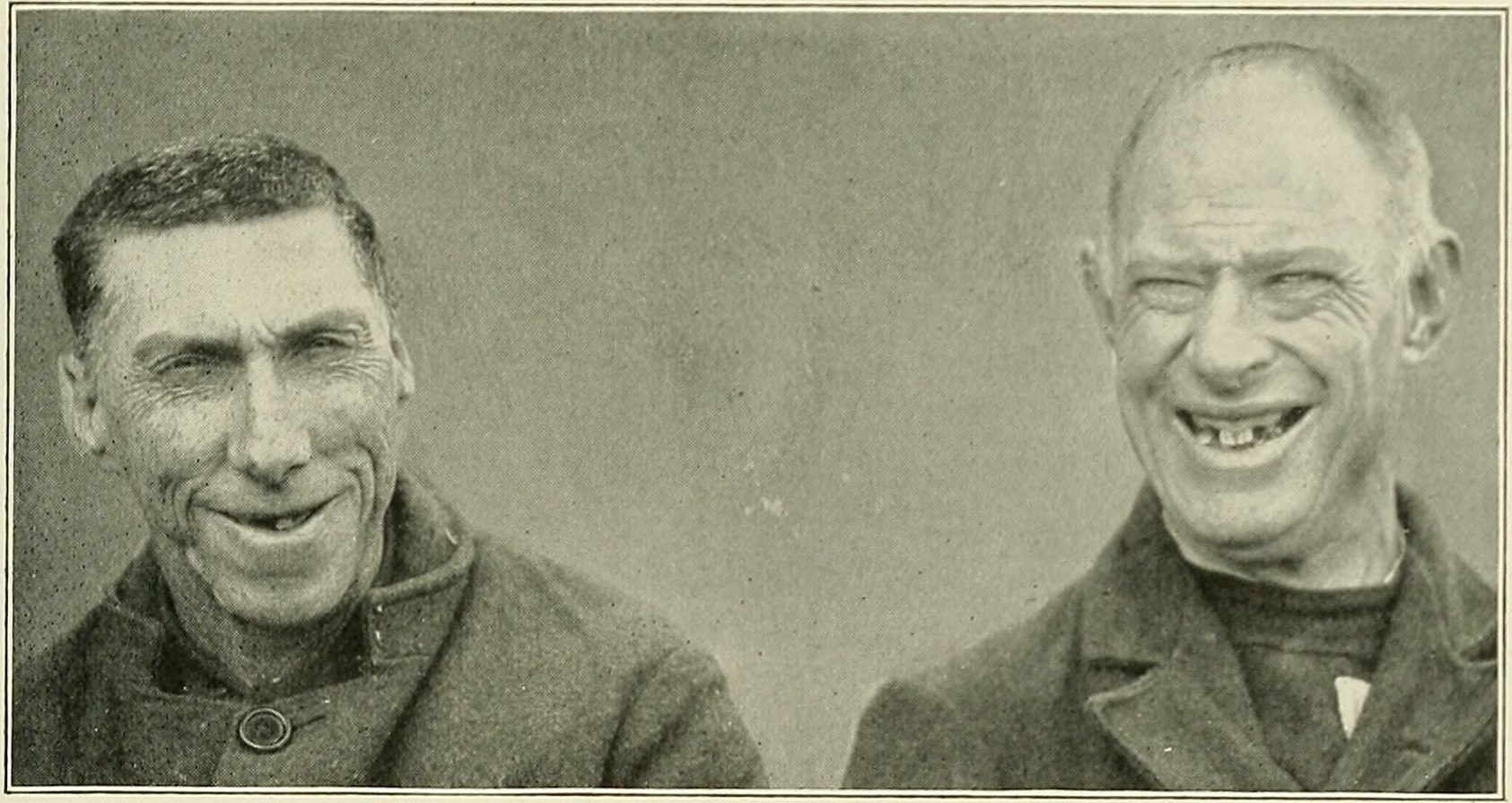
Microcephaly (left) vs. normocephaly (right)

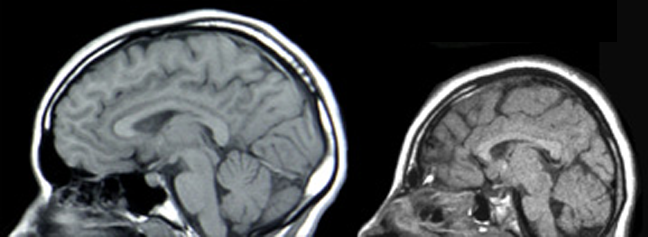
MRI images of a normal-sized skull (left) and a case of microcephaly (right)

There are a variety of symptoms that can occur in children. Infants with microcephaly are born with either a normal or reduced head size. Subsequently, the head fails to grow, while the face continues to develop at a normal rate, producing a child with a small head and a receding forehead, and a loose, often wrinkled scalp. As the child grows older, the smallness of the skull becomes more obvious, although the entire body also is often underweight and dwarfed.

Severely impaired intellectual development is common, but disturbances in motor functions may not appear until later in life. Affected newborns generally have striking neurological defects and seizures. Development of motor functions and speech may be delayed. Hyperactivity and intellectual disability are common occurrences, although the degree of each varies. Convulsions may also occur. Motor ability varies, ranging from clumsiness in some to spastic quadriplegia in others.

== Causes ==
Microcephaly is a type of cephalic disorder. It has been classified in two types based on the onset:

=== Congenital ===
- Isolated
  1. Familial (autosomal recessive) microcephaly
  2. Autosomal dominant microcephaly
  3. X-linked microcephaly
  4. Chromosomal (balanced rearrangements and ring chromosome)
- Syndromes
  - Chromosomal
    1. Poland syndrome
    2. Down syndrome
    3. Edward syndrome
    4. Patau syndrome
    5. Unbalanced rearrangements
  - Contiguous gene deletion
    1. 4p deletion (Wolf–Hirschhorn syndrome)
    2. 5p deletion (Cri-du-chat)
    3. 7q11.23 deletion (Williams syndrome)
    4. 22q11 deletion (DiGeorge syndrome)
- Single gene defects
  1. Smith–Lemli–Opitz syndrome
  2. Seckel syndrome
  3. Cornelia de Lange syndrome
  4. Dihydropteridine reductase deficiency - in up to 25% of patients
  5. 5,10-methenyltetrahydrofolate synthetase deficiency
  6. Holoprosencephaly
  7. Primary microcephaly
  8. Wiedemann-Steiner syndrome
- Acquired
  - Disruptive injuries
    1. Ischemic stroke
    2. Hemorrhagic stroke
    3. Death of a monozygotic twin
  - Vertically transmitted infections
    1. Congenital cytomegalovirus infection
    2. Toxoplasmosis
    3. Congenital rubella syndrome
    4. Congenital varicella syndrome
    5. Zika virus (see Zika fever#Microcephaly)
  - Drugs
    1. Fetal hydantoin syndrome
    2. Fetal alcohol syndrome
- Other
  1. Radiation exposure to mother
  2. Maternal malnutrition
  3. Maternal phenylketonuria
  4. Poorly controlled gestational diabetes
  5. Hyperthermia
  6. Maternal hypothyroidism
  7. Placental insufficiency
  8. Craniosynostosis

=== Postnatal onset ===
- Genetic
  - Inborn errors of metabolism
    1. Congenital disorder of glycosylation
    2. Mitochondrial disorders
    3. Peroxisomal disorder
    4. Glucose transporter defect
    5. Menkes disease
    6. Congenital disorders of amino acid metabolism
    7. Organic acidemia
- Syndromes
  - Contiguous gene deletion
    1. 17p13.3 deletion (Miller–Dieker syndrome)
  - Single gene defects
    1. Rett syndrome (primarily girls)
    2. Nijmegen breakage syndrome
    3. X-linked lissencephaly with abnormal genitalia
    4. Aicardi–Goutières syndrome
    5. Ataxia telangiectasia
    6. Cohen syndrome
    7. Cockayne syndrome
- Acquired
  - Disruptive injuries
    1. Traumatic brain injury
    2. Hypoxic-ischemic encephalopathy
    3. Ischemic stroke
    4. Hemorrhagic stroke
  - Infections
    1. Congenital HIV encephalopathy
    2. Meningitis
    3. Encephalitis
  - Toxins
    - Chronic kidney failure
  - Deprivation
    1. Hypothyroidism
    2. Anemia
    3. Congenital heart disease
    4. Malnutrition

Genetic mutations cause most cases of microcephaly. Relationships have been found between autism, duplications of genes and macrocephaly on one side. On the other side, a relationship has been found between schizophrenia, deletions of genes and microcephaly. Several genes have been designated "MCPH" genes, after microcephalin (MCPH1), based on their role in brain size and primary microcephaly syndromes when mutated. In addition to microcephalin, these include WDR62 (MCPH2), CDK5RAP2 (MCPH3), KNL1 (MCPH4), ASPM (MCPH5), CENPJ (MCPH6), STIL (MCPH7), CEP135 (MCPH8), CEP152 (MCPH9), ZNF335 (MCPH10), PHC1 (MCPH11) and CDK6 (MCPH12). Moreover, an association has been established between common genetic variants within known microcephaly genes (such as MCPH1 and CDK5RAP2) and normal variation in brain structure as measured with magnetic resonance imaging (MRI)‍—‌i.e., primarily brain cortical surface area and total brain volume.

=== Arbovirus ===
Bites and stings from Arthropods can often be a cause of vector-borne diseases. These include mosquitoes, fleas, sand flies, lice, ticks, and mites that are hematophagous vectors. The Centers for Disease Control (CDC) stated that "mosquitoes kill more people than any other creature and considers that mosquitoes are "the most dangerous animals on earth".

The spread of Aedes mosquito-borne Zika virus has been implicated in increasing levels of congenital microcephaly by the International Society for Infectious Diseases and the US Centers for Disease Control and Prevention. Zika can spread from a pregnant woman to her fetus. This can result in other severe brain malformations and birth defects. A study published in The New England Journal of Medicine has documented a case in which they found evidence of the Zika virus in the brain of a fetus that displayed the morphology of microcephaly.

=== Microlissencephaly ===
Microlissencephaly is microcephaly combined with lissencephaly (smooth brain surface due to absent sulci and gyri). Most cases of microlissencephaly are described in consanguineous families, suggesting an autosomal recessive inheritance.

=== Historical causes of microcephaly ===
After the dropping of atomic bombs "Little Boy" on Hiroshima and "Fat Man" on Nagasaki, several women close to ground zero who had been pregnant at the time gave birth to children with microcephaly. Microcephaly was present in 7 children from a group of 11 pregnant women at 11–17 weeks of gestation who survived the blast at less than 1.2 km (0.75 mi) from ground zero. Due to their proximity to the bomb, the pregnant women's in utero children received a biologically significant radiation dose that was relatively high due to the massive neutron output of the lower explosive-yielding Little Boy. Researchers studied 286 additional children who were in utero during the atomic bombings, and after a year they found these children had a higher incidence of microcephaly and intellectual disability.

=== Other relations ===
Intracranial volume also affects this pathology, as it is related with the size of the brain.

== Pathophysiology ==
Microcephaly generally is due to the diminished size of the largest part of the human brain, the cerebral cortex, and the condition can arise during embryonic and fetal development due to insufficient neural stem cell proliferation, impaired or premature neurogenesis, the death of neural stem cells or neurons, or a combination of these factors. Research in animal models such as rodents has found many genes that are required for normal brain growth. For example, the Notch pathway genes regulate the balance between stem cell proliferation and neurogenesis in the stem cell layer known as the ventricular zone, and experimental mutations of many genes can cause microcephaly in mice, similar to human microcephaly. Mutations of the abnormal spindle-like microcephaly-associated (ASPM) gene are associated with microcephaly in humans and a knockout model has been developed in ferrets that exhibits severe microcephaly. In addition, viruses such as cytomegalovirus (CMV) or Zika have been shown to infect and kill the primary stem cell of the brain—the radial glial cell, resulting in the loss of future daughter neurons. The severity of the condition may depend on the timing of infection during pregnancy.

Microcephaly is a feature common to several different genetic disorders arising from a deficiency in the cellular DNA damage response. Individuals with the following DNA damage response disorders exhibit microcephaly: Nijmegen breakage syndrome, ATR-Seckel syndrome, MCPH1-dependent primary microcephaly disorder, xeroderma pigmentosum complementation group A deficiency, Fanconi anemia, ligase 4 deficiency syndrome and Bloom syndrome. These findings suggest that a normal DNA damage response is critical during brain development, perhaps to protect against induction of apoptosis by DNA damage occurring in neurons.

== Treatment ==
Baby with microcephaly during a physical therapy session

There is no known cure for microcephaly. Treatment is symptomatic and supportive. Because some cases of microcephaly and its associated symptoms may be a result of amino acid deficiencies, treatment with amino acids in these cases has been shown to improve symptoms such as seizures and motor function delays.

== History ==
People with small heads were displayed as a public spectacle in ancient Rome.

Since 1839 it's been recorded that the Shrine of Shah Dola in Gujrat City keeps microcephalic beggars, known as the Rats of Shah Dola. While the practice at Shah Dola was nearly dead by the mid-2000's it is still common to encounter microcephalics begging for their masters across the Grand Trunk Road during religious holidays.

People with microcephaly were sometimes sold to freak shows in North America and Europe in the 19th and early 20th centuries, where they were known by the name "pinheads". Many of them were presented as different species (e.g., "monkey man") and described as being the missing link. Famous examples include Zip the Pinhead (although he may not have had microcephaly), Maximo and Bartola and Schlitzie the Pinhead. Stars of the 1932 film Freaks were cited as influences on the development of the long-running comic strip character Zippy the Pinhead, created by Bill Griffith.

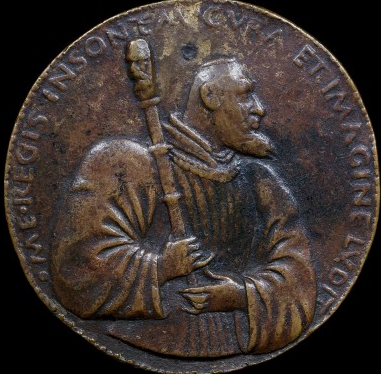
Triboulet, a French court jester, 1461

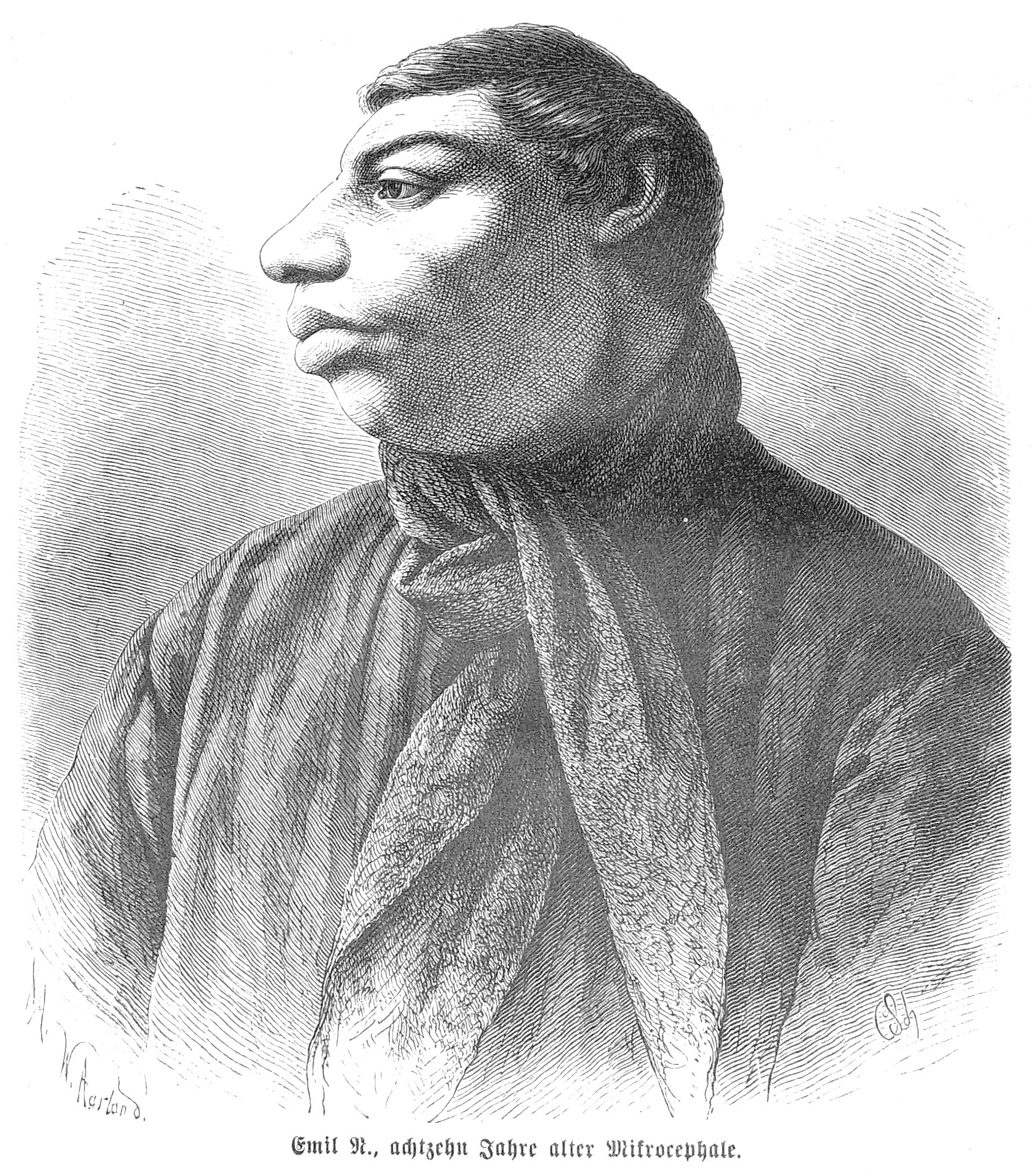
18-year-old Emil R., 1868

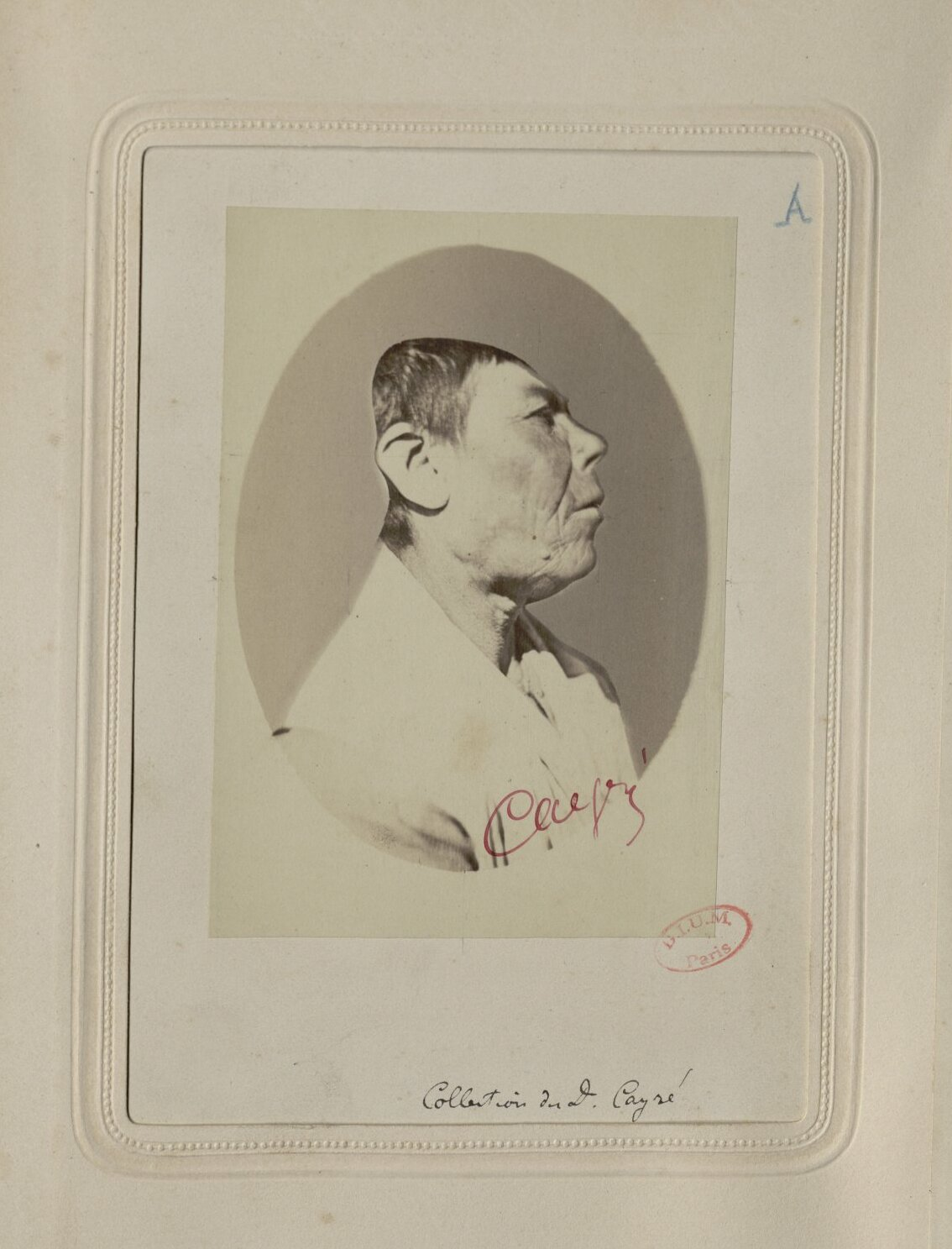
Elderly female, 1888/89

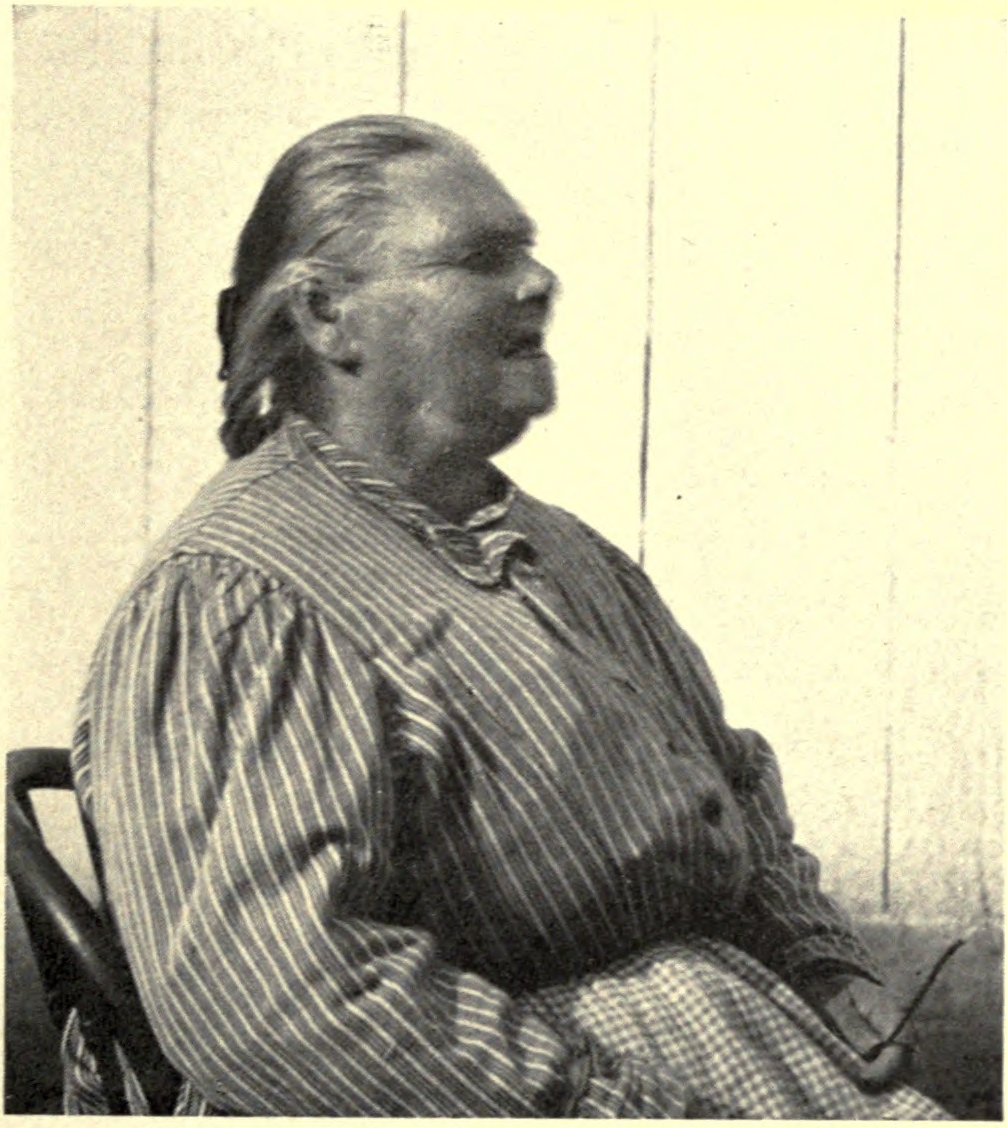
52-year-old female, 1900

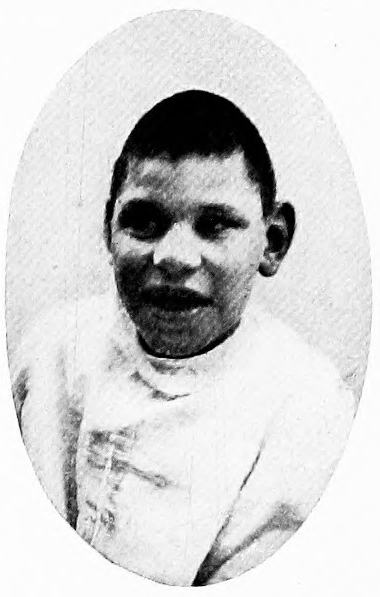
10-year-old male, 1904

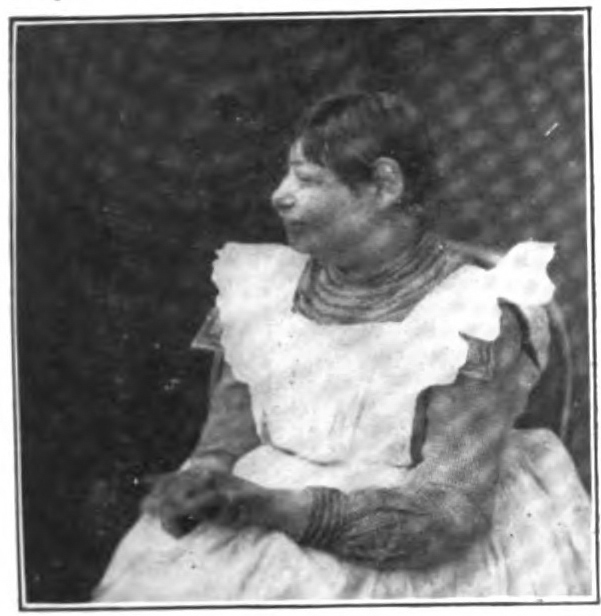
20-year-old female, 1906/07

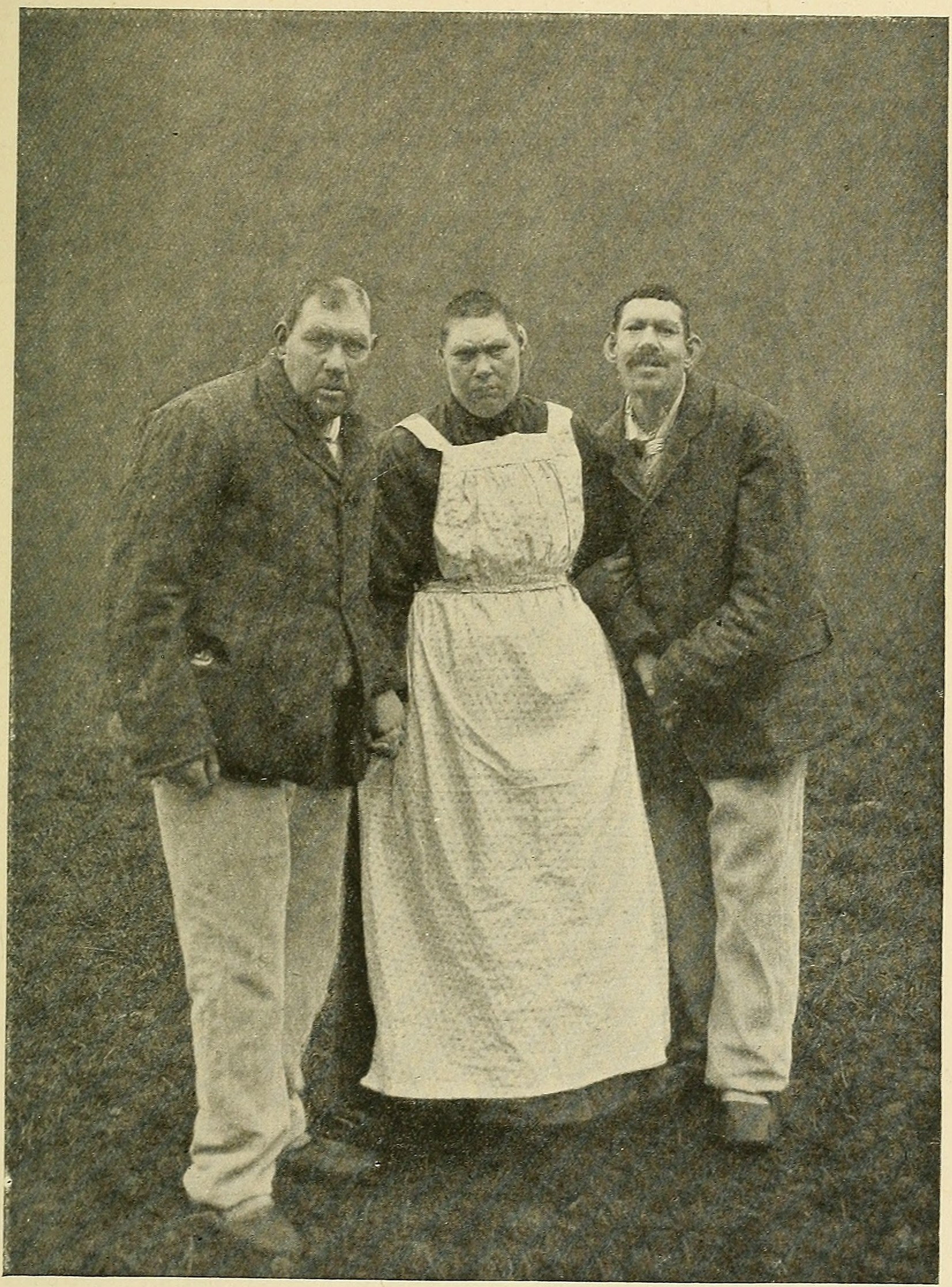
3 relatives, 1913

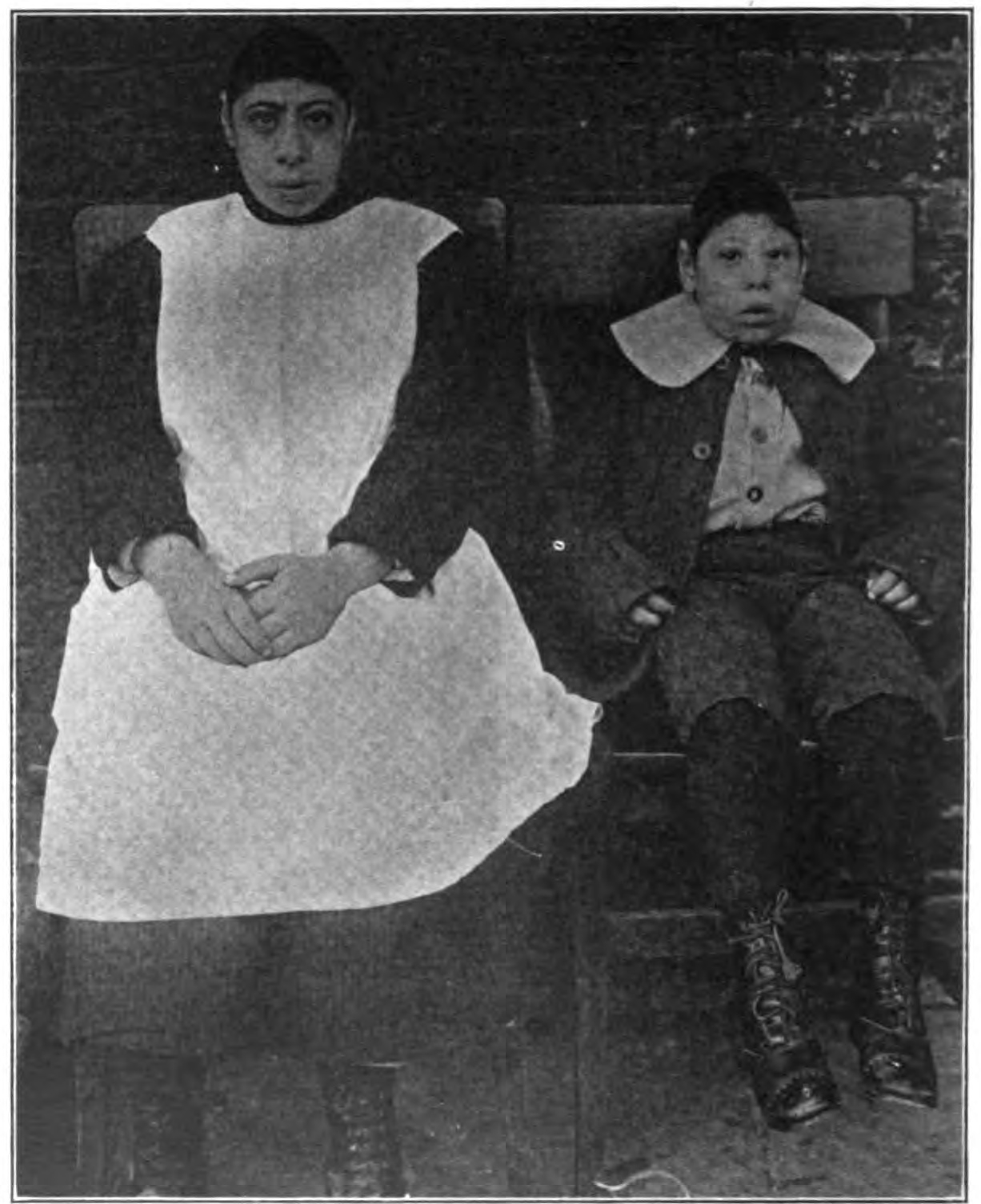
18-year-old sister and 9-year-old brother, 1917

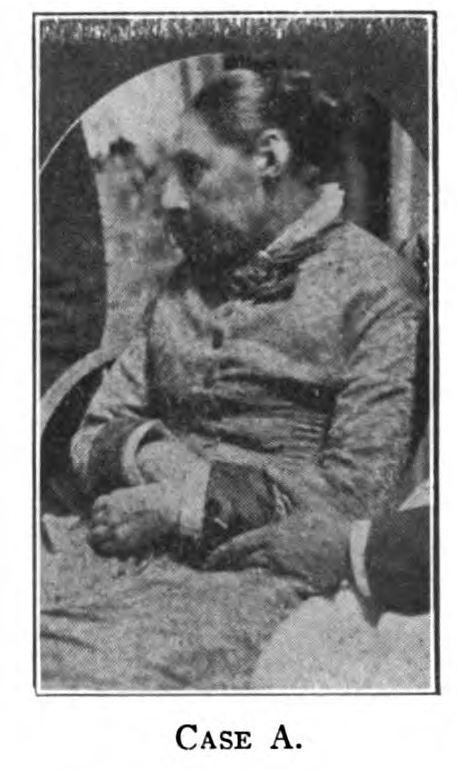
55-year-old female, 1920

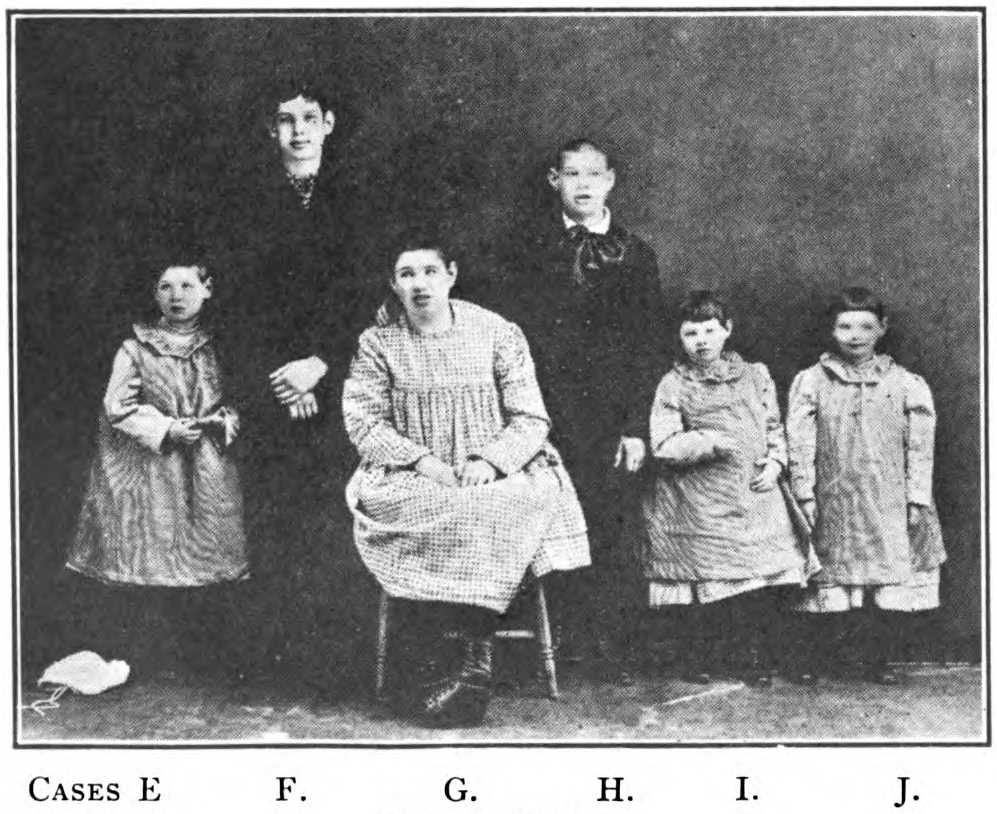
6 siblings, 1920

== Notable cases ==
- A 'dwarf' of Punt (ancient Somalia) was given by the Chief clans as partial tribute to the last ruler of Ancient Egypt's Old Kingdom, Pepi II Neferkare (6th Dynasty, circa 2125–2080 BC); it could be inferred that this person was also microcephalic. In a letter preserved at the British Museum, the young king gives instructions by letter, "Harkhuf! The men in your service [escorts; soldiers; sailors; guards, etc.] ought pay sincere care with the dwarf's head while sleeping during the voyage to the palace" (so that it does not fall off). At the same time, it could be for other reasons unrelated to microcephaly, etc.
- Triboulet, a jester of duke René of Anjou (not to be confused with the slightly later Triboulet at the French court).
- Jenny Lee Snow and Elvira Snow, whose stage names were Pip and Flip, respectively, were sisters with microcephaly who acted in the 1932 film Freaks.
- Schlitze "Schlitzie" Surtees, possibly born Simon Metz, was a widely known sideshow performer and actor, who also appeared in Freaks.
- Lester "Beetlejuice" Green, a member of radio host Howard Stern's Wack Pack.
- William Henry Johnson, an African American man from New Jersey who performed in freak shows under stage names What is It? and Zip the Pinhead.

== Fictional characters with microcephaly ==
- Zippy the Pinhead from Zippy
- Pepper and Salty from American Horror Story: Freak Show
- Bertram from Red Dead Redemption 2

== See also ==
- Anencephaly (Usually rapidly fatal)
- Cerebral rubicon
- Hydrocephaly
- Macrocephaly
- Seckel syndrome
- Achalasia microcephaly
- Oropouche orthobunyavirus
