= DSN1 =

Protein-coding gene in the species Homo sapiens

Identifiers
- Aliases: DSN1, C20orf172, KNL3, MIS13, dJ469A13.2, hKNL-3, DSN1 homolog, MIS12 kinetochore complex component, DSN1 component of MIS12 kinetochore complex
- External IDs: OMIM: 609175; MGI: 1914184; HomoloGene: 49806; GeneCards: DSN1; OMA:DSN1 - orthologs

Gene location (Human)
Chr.	Chromosome 20 (human)
Band	20q11.23	Start	36,751,791 bp
Band	20q11.23	End	36,773,818 bp

Gene location (Mouse)
Chr.	Chromosome 2 (mouse)
Band	2|2 H1	Start	156,837,185 bp
Band	2|2 H1	End	156,849,074 bp
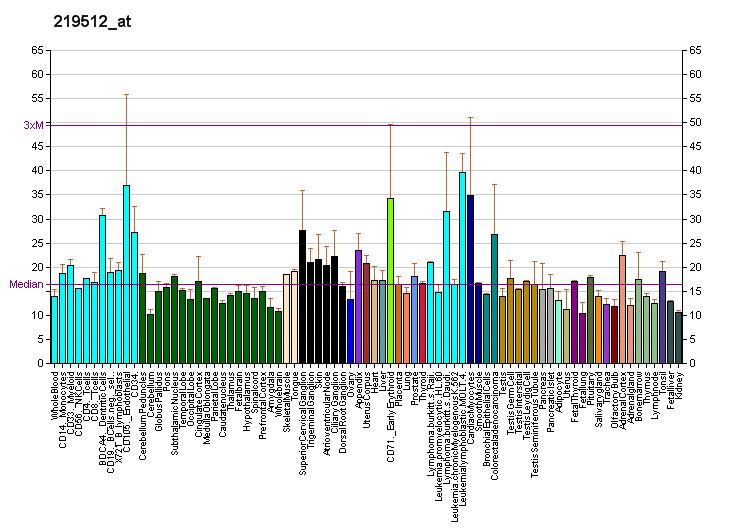
RNA expression pattern
Bgee	Human / Mouse (ortholog); Top expressed in: gonad; ventricular zone; right testis; secondary oocyte; left testis; ganglionic eminence; testicle; rectum; right adrenal cortex; mucosa of transverse colon / Top expressed in: zygote; secondary oocyte; spermatocyte; primary oocyte; spermatid; genital tubercle; yolk sac; ventricular zone; tail of embryo; morula; More reference expression data
BioGPS	More reference expression data
Gene ontology
Molecular function	protein binding
Cellular component	MIS12/MIND type complex; chromosome, centromeric region; nucleus; kinetochore; chromosome; extracellular region; cytosol; azurophil granule lumen; nuclear MIS12/MIND complex; spindle pole; fibrillar center; nucleolus; nuclear body
Biological process	chromosome segregation; cell division; cell cycle; neutrophil degranulation; mitotic sister chromatid segregation; attachment of spindle microtubules to kinetochore involved in meiotic sister chromatid segregation
Sources:Amigo / QuickGO
Orthologs
Species	Human	Mouse
Entrez	79980	66934
Ensembl	ENSG00000149636	ENSMUSG00000027635
UniProt	Q9H410	Q9CYC5
RefSeq (mRNA)	NM_001145315; NM_001145316; NM_001145317; NM_001145318; NM_024918	NM_025853
RefSeq (protein)	NP_001138787; NP_001138788; NP_001138789; NP_001138790; NP_079194	NP_080129
Location (UCSC)	Chr 20: 36.75 – 36.77 Mb	Chr 2: 156.84 – 156.85 Mb
PubMed search
- Wikidata
View/Edit Human	View/Edit Mouse

DSN1, MIND kinetochore complex component, homolog (S. cerevisiae), also known as DSN1 or MIS13, is a protein which in humans encoded by the DSN1 gene.

== Function ==
DSN1 along with MIS12, DC8, PMF1, CBX5, ZWINT is a component of the kinetochore-associated multiprotein complex which is required for correct chromosome alignment during the metaphase of cell mitosis.

== Interactions ==
DSN1 has been shown to interact with NSL1 and MIS12.
