= Comprachicos =

Belief in criminals that deform growing children

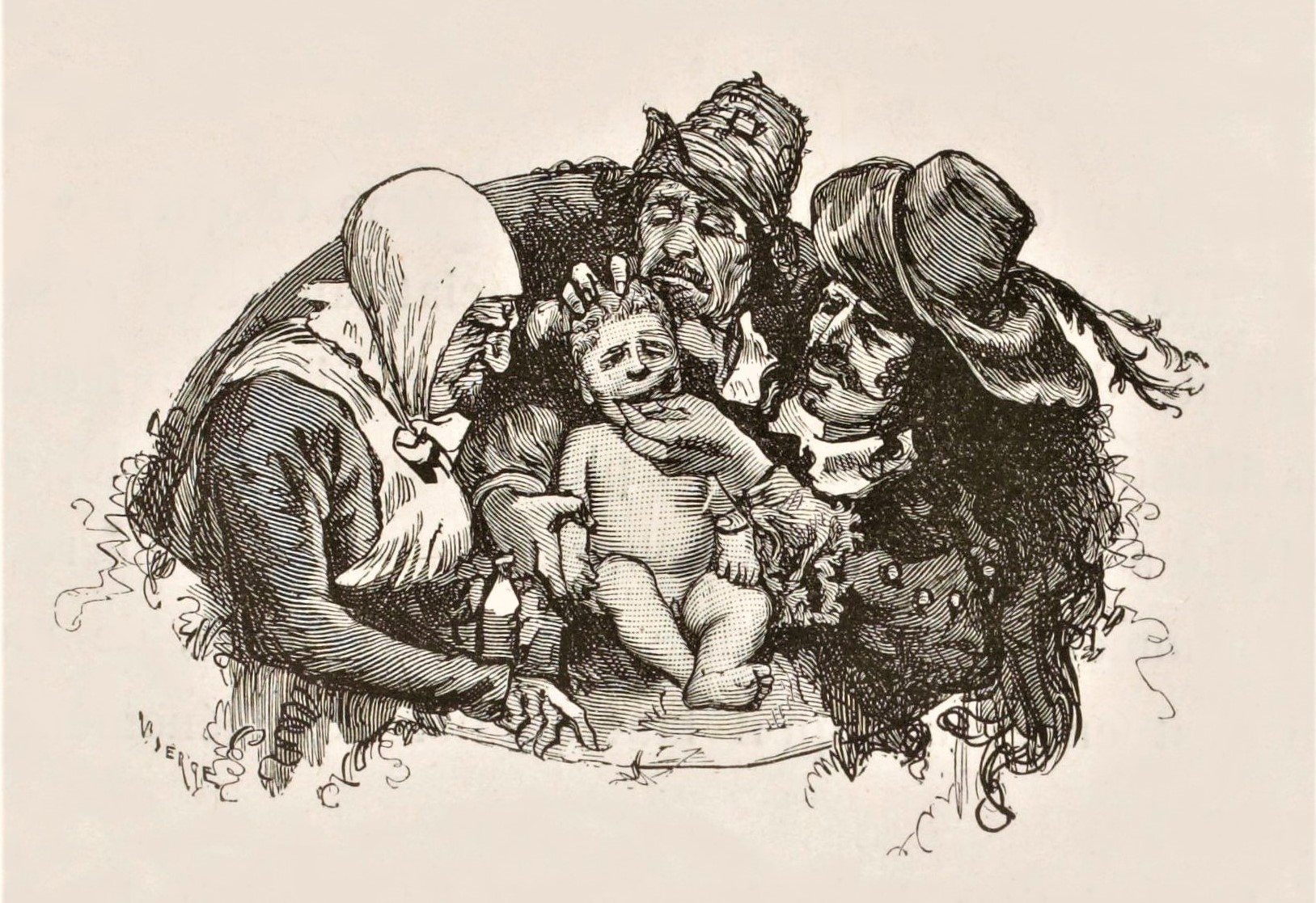
Comprachicos, illustrated by Daniel Vierge

Comprachicos are groups in European folklore who were said to physically cripple and deform children to work as beggars or living curiosities. The most common methods said to be used in this practice included stunting children's growth by physical restraint, muzzling their faces to deform them, slitting their eyes, dislocating their joints, and causing their bones to malform. The term, a compound Spanish neologism meaning "child-buyers", was coined by Victor Hugo in The Man Who Laughs, an 1869 novel which triggered moral panics over supposed "cripple factories" across Europe. The words comprapequeños, cheylas and zaghles are also used. The resulting dwarfed and deformed adults made their living as mountebanks and freak show performers or were sold into bondage as pages, jesters, or court dwarfs.

== Historical references ==
One of the common creations of the comprachicos was supposed to be artificial dwarfs, formed "by anointing babies' spines with the grease of bats, moles and dormice" and using drugs such as "dwarf elder, knotgrass (Note: Either Polygonum or Paspalum distichum), and daisy juice". The conception was known to Shakespeare, as Beatrice K. Otto pointed out, quoting A Midsummer Night's Dream:

Get you gone, dwarf;
You minimus, of hindering knot-grass made;

Other means of creating this result were conjectured to include physical stunting by breaking or dislocating bones, and forcible constraint, whereby growth was inhibited for a long enough period to create permanent deformation. Because of the demand for dwarfs and other novelties in the courts of kings at this time, this could have been a profitable occupation.

== Hugo ==
Victor Hugo's novel The Man Who Laughs is the story of a young aristocrat kidnapped and disfigured by his captors to display a permanent malicious grin. At the opening of the book, Hugo provides a description of the Comprachicos:

The Comprachicos worked on man as the Chinese work on trees. (Note: An outdated understanding of the Japanese art of Bonsai trees) A sort of fantastic stunted thing left their hands; it was ridiculous and wonderful. They could touch up a little being with such skill that its father could not have recognized it. Sometimes they left the spine straight and remade the face. Children destined for tumblers had their joints dislocated in a masterly manner; thus gymnasts were made. Not only did the Comprachicos take away his face from the child; they also took away his memory. At least, they took away all they could of it; the child had no consciousness of the mutilation to which he had been subjected. Of burnings by sulphur and incisions by the iron he remembered nothing. The Comprachicos deadened the little patient by means of a stupefying powder which was thought to be magical and which suppressed all pain.

According to John Boynton Kaiser, "Victor Hugo has given us a pretty faithful picture of many characteristic details of social England of the 17th century; but the word Comprachicos is used to describe a people whose characteristics are an unhistorical conglomeration of much that was once actual but then obsolete in the history of human society."

== Modern references ==
The term comprachico is very uncommonly used in modern English except in reference or allusion to the antiquated folklore, but similar stories do exist in the English-speaking world. For instance, a tale circulating since at least the 1980s tells of a Japanese bride who disappears during her honeymoon in Europe; years later her husband discovers she has been abducted, mutilated, and forced to work in a freak show. The shock documentary Mondo Cane (1962) shows apparently actual criminals arrested for crippling children to be used as beggars. The novel Q & A (2005) and its film adaptation Slumdog Millionaire (2008) portrays a gang that blinds children to create beggars, something that is a known occurrence in some parts of India and China.

"Comprachico" has been adopted as a morbid or pejorative term used for individuals and entities who manipulate the minds and attitudes of children in a way that will permanently distort their beliefs or worldview. Twentieth-century philosopher Ayn Rand referred to educators of the time as "the Comprachicos of the mind" in her article "The Comprachicos". Her criticism was targeted especially toward educational progressivists, but also grade-school and high-school educators who, in her view, used psychologically harmful methods of education.

James Ellroy refers to them and Victor Hugo's novel in The Black Dahlia, where the concept is a major motivation for the murder of Elizabeth Short.

== See also ==
- Imbunche
- Artificial cranial deformation
- Foot binding
- Castrato
- Kyphosis
- Rats of Shah Dola
