= Monopolin =

Protein complex

Monopolin complex subunit CSM1

Identifiers
- Organism: S. cerevisiae
- Symbol: CSM1
- Entrez: 850447
- Orthologs: NCBI: entry; OMA: entry
- RefSeq (mRNA): NM_001178792
- RefSeq (Prot): NP_010009
- UniProt: P25651

Other data
- Chromosome: III: 0.26 - 0.26 Mb
Search for
- Structures: Swiss-model
- Domains: InterPro

Casein kinase I homolog HRR25

Identifiers
- Organism: S. cerevisiae
- Symbol: HRR25
- Entrez: 855897
- Orthologs: NCBI: entry; OMA: entry
- RefSeq (mRNA): NM_001184018
- RefSeq (Prot): NP_015120
- UniProt: P29295

Other data
- EC number: 2.7.11.1
- Chromosome: XVI: 0.16 - 0.17 Mb
Search for
- Structures: Swiss-model
- Domains: InterPro

Monopolin complex subunit LRS4

Identifiers
- Organism: S. cerevisiae
- Symbol: LRS4
- Entrez: 852049
- Orthologs: NCBI: entry; OMA: entry
- RefSeq (mRNA): NM_001180747
- RefSeq (Prot): NP_010727
- UniProt: Q04087

Other data
- Chromosome: IV: 1.34 - 1.34 Mb
Search for
- Structures: Swiss-model
- Domains: InterPro

Monopolin complex subunit MAM1

Identifiers
- Organism: S. cerevisiae
- Symbol: MAM1
- Entrez: 856843
- Orthologs: NCBI: entry; OMA: entry
- RefSeq (mRNA): NM_001178997
- RefSeq (Prot): NP_011032
- UniProt: P40065

Other data
- Chromosome: V: 0.37 - 0.37 Mb
Search for
- Structures: Swiss-model
- Domains: InterPro

Monopolin is a protein complex that in budding yeast is composed of the four proteins CSM1, HRR25, LRS4, and MAM1. Monopolin is required for the segregation of homologous centromeres to opposite poles of a dividing cell during anaphase I of meiosis. This occurs by bridging DSN1 kinetochore proteins to sister kinetochores within the centromere to physically fuse them and allow for the microtubules to pull each homolog toward opposite mitotic spindles.

== Molecular structure ==
Monopolin is composed of a 4 CSM1:2 LRS4 complex which forms a V-shaped structure with two globular heads at the ends, which are responsible for directly crosslinking sister kinetochores. Bound to each CSM1 head is a MAM1 protein which recruits one copy of the HRR25 kinase. The hydrophobic cavity on the CSM1 subunit allows the hydrophobic regions of Monopolin receptor and kinetochore protein, DSN1, to bind to and fuse the sister kinetochores. Microtubules can then attach to the kinetochores on the homologous centromeres and pull them toward opposite mitotic spindles to complete anaphase of meiosis I.
