= KNL1 =

Protein

Identifiers
- Aliases: KNL1, AF15Q14, CT29, D40, PPP1R55, Spc7, hKNL-1, hSpc105, CASC5, MCPH4, cancer susceptibility candidate 5, kinetochore scaffold 1
- External IDs: OMIM: 609173; MGI: 1923714; GeneCards: KNL1
Available structures
PDB	Ortholog search: PDBe RCSB
PDB	List of PDB id codes 3SI5, 4A1G, 4NF9, 4NFA

Gene location (Human)
Chr.	Chromosome 15 (human)
Band	15q15.1	Start	40,594,020 bp
Band	15q15.1	End	40,664,342 bp

Gene location (Mouse)
Chr.	Chromosome 2 (mouse)
Band	2|2 E5	Start	118,877,600 bp
Band	2|2 E5	End	118,935,982 bp
RNA expression pattern
Bgee	Human / Mouse (ortholog); Top expressed in: testicle; ventricular zone; gonad; jejunal mucosa; secondary oocyte; sperm; ganglionic eminence; trabecular bone; right testis; bone marrow / Top expressed in: tail of embryo; zygote; genital tubercle; spermatocyte; secondary oocyte; lumbar spinal ganglion; ventricular zone; embryo; embryo; blastocyst; More reference expression data
BioGPS	n/a
Gene ontology
Molecular function	protein binding
Cellular component	chromosome; nucleoplasm; acrosomal vesicle; chromosome, centromeric region; nucleus; kinetochore; cytosol; nuclear body
Biological process	chromosome segregation; negative regulation of phosphatase activity; CENP-A containing chromatin assembly; cell division; acrosome assembly; cell cycle; attachment of spindle microtubules to kinetochore; protein localization to kinetochore
Sources:Amigo / QuickGO
Orthologs
Databases	NCBI: entry; OMA: entry
Species	Human	Mouse
Entrez	57082	76464
Ensembl	ENSG00000137812	ENSMUSG00000027326
UniProt	Q8NG31	Q66JQ7
RefSeq (mRNA)	NM_144508; NM_170589; NM_020380	NM_029617; NM_001362732
RefSeq (protein)	NP_653091; NP_733468	NP_083893; NP_001349661
Location (UCSC)	Chr 15: 40.59 – 40.66 Mb	Chr 2: 118.88 – 118.94 Mb
PubMed search
- Wikidata
View/Edit Human	View/Edit Mouse

KNL1 (kinetochore scaffold 1, a.k.a. CASC5) is a protein that is encoded by the KNL1 gene in humans.

== Function ==
KNL1 is part of the outer kinetochore. It is a part of KMN network of proteins together with MIS12, and NDC80.

KNL1 is involved in microtubule attachment to chromosome centromeres and in the activation of the spindle checkpoint during mitosis. The CASC5 gene is upregulated in the areas of cell proliferation surrounding the ventricles during fetal brain development.

== Interactions ==
CASC5 has been shown to interact with MIS12, BUB1, BUBR1 and ZWINT-1.

== Polymorphisms ==
Homozygous polymorphisms in the CASC5 gene have been seen in patients with autosomal recessive primary microcephaly (MCPH). The mutation resulted in the skipping of exon 18 transcription, causing a frameshift and the production of a truncated protein. This truncation inhibits the binding ability of MIS12.
