= NSL1 =

Protein-coding gene in humans

Identifiers
- Aliases: NSL1, C1orf48, MIS14, DC8, MIS12 kinetochore complex component, NSL1 component of MIS12 kinetochore complex
- External IDs: OMIM: 609174; MGI: 2685830; GeneCards: NSL1
Available structures
PDB	Ortholog search: PDBe RCSB
PDB	List of PDB id codes 4NF9

Gene location (Human)
Chr.	Chromosome 1 (human)
Band	1q32.3	Start	212,726,153 bp
Band	1q32.3	End	212,791,782 bp

Gene location (Mouse)
Chr.	Chromosome 1 (mouse)
Band	1|1 H6	Start	190,795,209 bp
Band	1|1 H6	End	190,818,671 bp
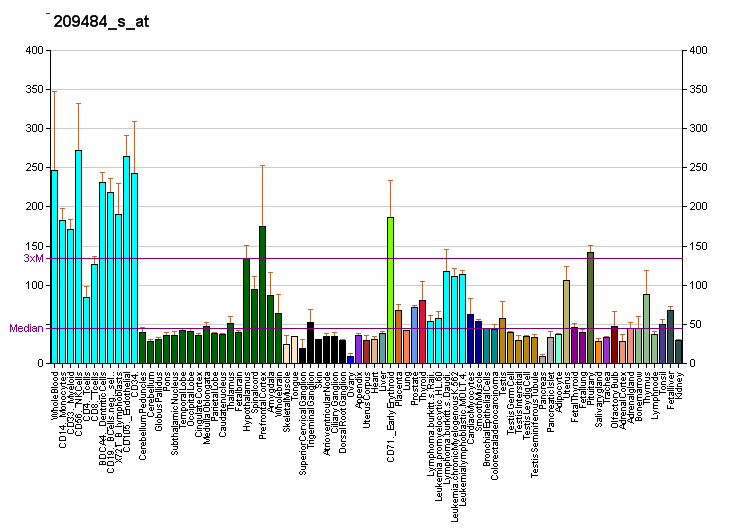
RNA expression pattern
Bgee	Human / Mouse (ortholog); Top expressed in: secondary oocyte; optic nerve; germinal epithelium; Epithelium of choroid plexus; hair follicle; tibia; inferior ganglion of vagus nerve; trabecular bone; kidney tubule; parietal pleura / Top expressed in: hand; yolk sac; epiblast; primitive streak; ventricular zone; spermatocyte; embryo; tail of embryo; cumulus cell; thymus; More reference expression data
BioGPS	More reference expression data
Gene ontology
Molecular function	protein binding
Cellular component	MIS12/MIND type complex; chromosome, centromeric region; nucleus; kinetochore; chromosome; nucleoplasm; nuclear speck; cytosol
Biological process	cell division; cell cycle; chromosome segregation; mitotic sister chromatid segregation
Sources:Amigo / QuickGO
Orthologs
Databases	NCBI: entry; OMA: entry
Species	Human	Mouse
Entrez	25936	381318
Ensembl	ENSG00000117697	ENSMUSG00000062510
UniProt	Q96IY1	Q8K305
RefSeq (mRNA)	NM_015471; NM_001042549; NM_001297736; NM_001297737; NM_001297739	NM_198654
RefSeq (protein)	NP_001036014; NP_001284665; NP_001284666; NP_001284668; NP_056286	n/a
Location (UCSC)	Chr 1: 212.73 – 212.79 Mb	Chr 1: 190.8 – 190.82 Mb
PubMed search
- Wikidata
View/Edit Human	View/Edit Mouse

Kinetochore-associated protein NSL1 homolog is a protein that in humans is encoded by the NSL1 gene.

This gene encodes a protein with two coiled-coil domains that localizes to kinetochores, which are chromosome-associated structures that attach to microtubules and mediate chromosome movements during cell division. The encoded protein is part of a conserved protein complex that includes two chromodomain-containing proteins and a component of the outer plate of the kinetochore. This protein complex is proposed to bridge centromeric heterochromatin with the outer kinetochore structure. Multiple transcript variants encoding different isoforms have been found for this gene.

== Interactions ==
NSL1 has been shown to interact with MIS12 and DSN1.
