= MIS12 =

Protein-coding gene in the species Homo sapiens

Identifiers
- Aliases: MIS12, 2510025F08Rik, KNTC2AP, MTW1, hMis12, kinetochore complex component, MIS12 kinetochore complex component
- External IDs: OMIM: 609178; MGI: 1914389; HomoloGene: 11429; GeneCards: MIS12; OMA:MIS12 - orthologs

Gene location (Human)
Chr.	Chromosome 17 (human)
Band	17p13.2	Start	5,486,285 bp
Band	17p13.2	End	5,490,814 bp

Gene location (Mouse)
Chr.	Chromosome 11 (mouse)
Band	11|11 B4	Start	70,910,437 bp
Band	11|11 B4	End	70,918,197 bp
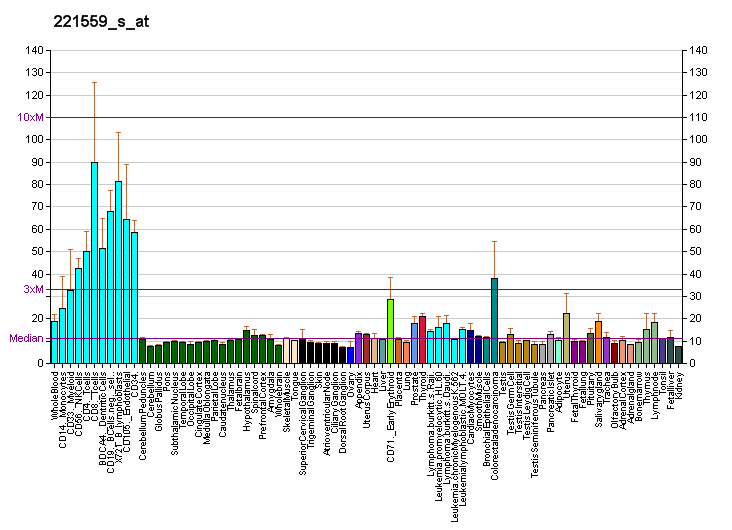
RNA expression pattern
Bgee	Human / Mouse (ortholog); Top expressed in: corpus epididymis; germinal epithelium; parietal pleura; bronchial epithelial cell; visceral pleura; tibia; superficial temporal artery; ventricular zone; palpebral conjunctiva; epithelium of nasopharynx / Top expressed in: otic vesicle; otic placode; zygote; saccule; maxillary prominence; tail of embryo; mandibular prominence; hand; ventricular zone; secondary oocyte; More reference expression data
BioGPS	More reference expression data
Gene ontology
Molecular function	protein binding
Cellular component	chromosome; cytosol; MIS12/MIND type complex; chromosome, centromeric region; nucleus; kinetochore; nuclear MIS12/MIND complex
Biological process	chromosome segregation; cell division; cell cycle; kinetochore assembly; attachment of mitotic spindle microtubules to kinetochore; mitotic cell cycle; protein localization to kinetochore; mitotic sister chromatid segregation
Sources:Amigo / QuickGO
Orthologs
Species	Human	Mouse
Entrez	79003	67139
Ensembl	ENSG00000167842	ENSMUSG00000040599
UniProt	Q9H081	Q9CY25
RefSeq (mRNA)	NM_001258217; NM_001258218; NM_001258219; NM_001258220; NM_024039	NM_025993
RefSeq (protein)	NP_001245146; NP_001245147; NP_001245148; NP_001245149; NP_076944	NP_080269
Location (UCSC)	Chr 17: 5.49 – 5.49 Mb	Chr 11: 70.91 – 70.92 Mb
PubMed search
- Wikidata
View/Edit Human	View/Edit Mouse

Protein MIS12 homolog is a protein that in humans is encoded by the MIS12 gene.

== Interactions ==
MIS12 has been shown to interact with NSL1, ZWINT, CASC5, Polyamine-modulated factor 1, NDC80, DSN1 and CBX5.
