= CSM1 =

Protein

Monopolin complex subunit CSM1

Identifiers
- Organism: S. cerevisiae
- Symbol: CSM1
- Entrez: 850447
- Orthologs: NCBI: entry; OMA: entry
- RefSeq (mRNA): NM_001178792
- RefSeq (Prot): NP_010009
- UniProt: P25651

Other data
- Chromosome: III: 0.26 - 0.26 Mb
Search for
- Structures: Swiss-model
- Domains: InterPro

CSM1 (RNA name: Csm1p) is a protein that in Saccharomyces cerevisiae strain S288c is encoded by the CSM1 gene.

== Bibliography ==
- Brito IL, Monje-Casas F, Amon A (September 2010). "The Lrs4-Csm1 monopolin complex associates with kinetochores during anaphase and is required for accurate chromosome segregation". Cell Cycle. 9 (17): 3611–8. doi:10.4161/cc.9.17.12885. PMC 3047622. PMID 20818155.
- Chan JN, Poon BP, Salvi J, Olsen JB, Emili A, Mekhail K (June 2011). "Perinuclear cohibin complexes maintain replicative life span via roles at distinct silent chromatin domains". Developmental Cell. 20 (6): 867–79. doi:10.1016/j.devcel.2011.05.014. PMID 21664583.
- Corbett KD, Harrison SC (June 2012). "Molecular architecture of the yeast monopolin complex". Cell Reports. 1 (6): 583–9. doi:10.1016/j.celrep.2012.05.012. PMC 3494995. PMID 22813733.
- Franzosa EA, Albanèse V, Frydman J, Xia Y, McClellan AJ (2011). Kudla G (ed.). "Heterozygous yeast deletion collection screens reveal essential targets of Hsp90". PLOS ONE. 6 (11) e28211. Bibcode:2011PLoSO...628211F. doi:10.1371/journal.pone.0028211. PMC 3227642. PMID 22140548.
- Sharifpoor S, van Dyk D, Costanzo M, Baryshnikova A, Friesen H, Douglas AC, Youn JY, VanderSluis B, Myers CL, Papp B, Boone C, Andrews BJ (April 2012). "Functional wiring of the yeast kinome revealed by global analysis of genetic network motifs". Genome Research. 22 (4): 791–801. doi:10.1101/gr.129213.111. PMC 3317160. PMID 22282571.
