= RAB3C =

Protein-coding gene in the species Homo sapiens

Identifiers
- Aliases: RAB3C, member RAS oncogene family
- External IDs: OMIM: 612829; MGI: 1914545; GeneCards: RAB3C
Enzyme activity
EC #	BRENDA	ExPASy	KEGG	MetaCyc
3.6.5.2	↗	↗	↗	↗

Gene location (Human)
Chr.	Chromosome 5 (human)
Band	5q11.2	Start	58,582,221 bp
Band	5q11.2	End	58,859,394 bp

Gene location (Mouse)
Chr.	Chromosome 13 (mouse)
Band	13|13 D2.1	Start	110,190,721 bp
Band	13|13 D2.1	End	110,417,530 bp
RNA expression pattern
Bgee	Human / Mouse (ortholog); Top expressed in: lateral nuclear group of thalamus; pars compacta; pars reticulata; Brodmann area 46; middle temporal gyrus; superior frontal gyrus; Brodmann area 23; superior vestibular nucleus; islet of Langerhans; postcentral gyrus / Top expressed in: medial dorsal nucleus; ventral tegmental area; medial geniculate nucleus; subiculum; lateral geniculate nucleus; superior colliculus; dorsomedial hypothalamic nucleus; paraventricular nucleus of hypothalamus; dorsal tegmental nucleus; anterior amygdaloid area; More reference expression data
BioGPS	n/a
Gene ontology
Molecular function	nucleotide binding; GTP binding; myosin V binding; protein binding; GTP-dependent protein binding; GTPase activity
Cellular component	perinuclear region of cytoplasm; vesicle; cytosol; plasma membrane; membrane; synaptic vesicle; anchored component of synaptic vesicle membrane; endosome
Biological process	regulation of exocytosis; protein transport; antigen processing and presentation; intracellular protein transport; vesicle docking involved in exocytosis; protein secretion; Rab protein signal transduction; protein localization to plasma membrane
Sources:Amigo / QuickGO
Orthologs
Databases	NCBI: entry; OMA: entry
Species	Human	Mouse
Entrez	115827	67295
Ensembl	ENSG00000152932	ENSMUSG00000021700
UniProt	Q96E17	P62823
RefSeq (mRNA)	NM_138453; NM_001317915	NM_023852; NM_001360099
RefSeq (protein)	NP_001304844; NP_612462	NP_076341; NP_001347028
Location (UCSC)	Chr 5: 58.58 – 58.86 Mb	Chr 13: 110.19 – 110.42 Mb
PubMed search
- Wikidata
View/Edit Human	View/Edit Mouse

Ras-related protein Rab-3C is a protein that in humans is encoded by the RAB3C gene.

== Interactions ==
Rab3C has been shown to interact with ZWINT.
