= Le roi s'amuse =

1832 French play by Victor Hugo

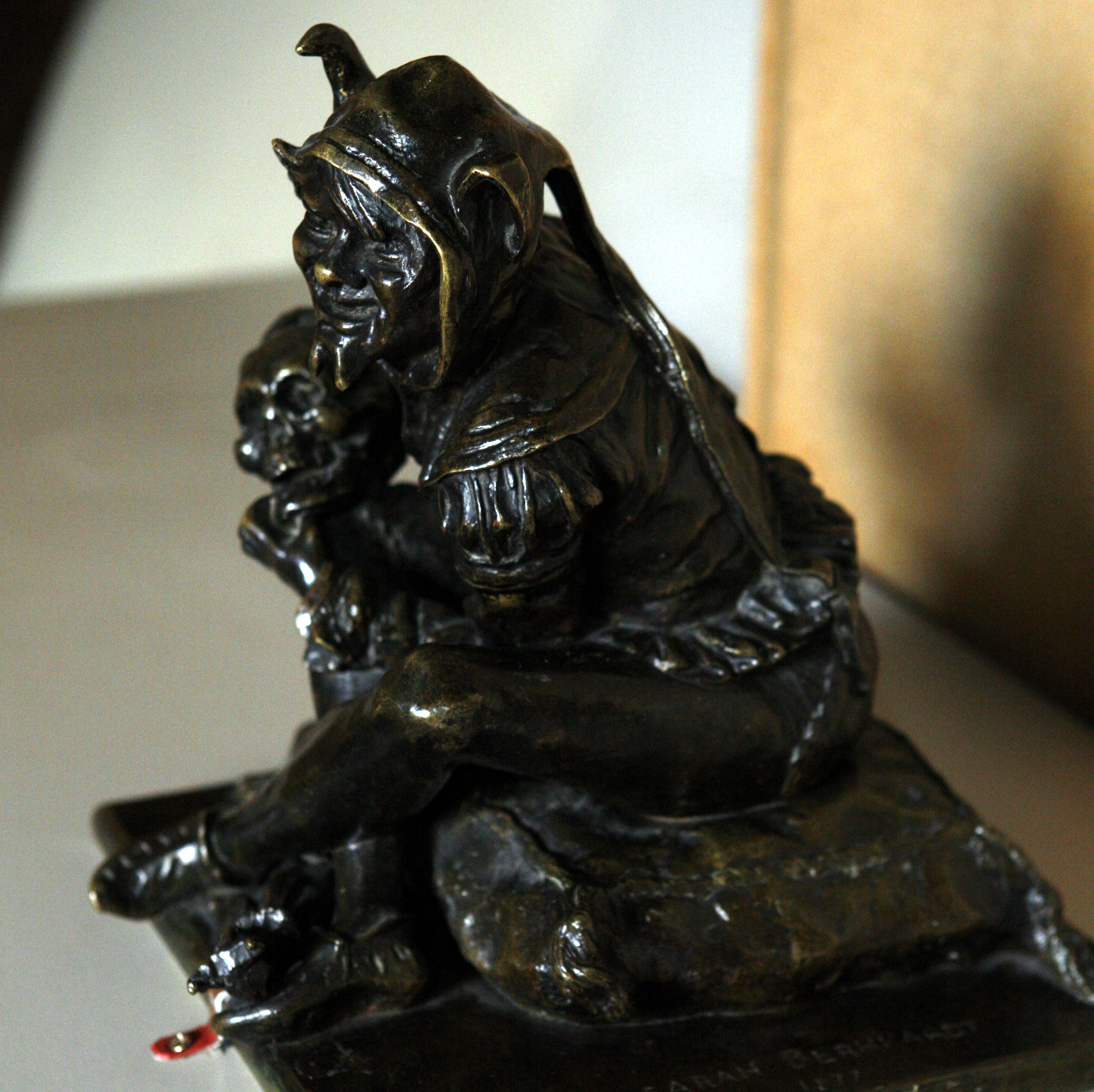
The character Triboulet (sculpture by Sarah Bernhardt)

Le roi s'amuse (French pronunciation: [lə ʁwa samyz]; literally, The King Amuses Himself or The King Has Fun) is a French play in five acts written by Victor Hugo. First performed on 22 November 1832 but banned by the government after one evening, the play was used for Giuseppe Verdi's 1851 opera Rigoletto.

== Cast of characters ==
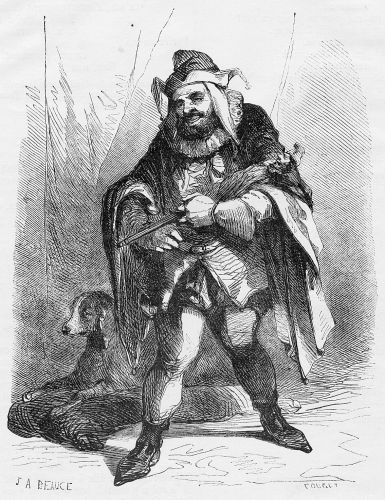
"Triboulet"; illustration for Le Roi s'amuse by J. A. Beaucé and Georges Rouget

- Francis I, king of France
- Triboulet, his jester
- Blanche, daughter of Triboulet
- Monsieur de Saint-Vallier, father of Diane de Poitiers
- Saltabadil, a hired assassin
- Maguelonne, a street player
- Clément Marot, royal poet
- Monsieur de Pienne
- Monsieur de Gordes
- Monsieur de Pardaillan
- Monsieur de Brion
- Monsieur de Montchenu
- Monsieur de Montmorency
- Monsieur de Cossé
- Monsieur de La Tour-Landry
- Monsieur de Vic
- Madame de Cossé
- Dame Bérarde
- A Gentleman of the Queen
- A Valet of the King
- Doctor
- Seigneurs, Pages
- Common folk

== Synopsis ==
The action takes place in Paris in an unspecified year in the 1520s.

The first act is set during a nocturnal party at the Louvre palace; the second in the deserted cul-de-sac Bussy; (Note: Now the Rue de Buci, 6ème arrondissement) the third in an antechamber of the King at the Louvre, then the fourth and fifth acts on the banks of the river Seine by the Château de la Tournelle.

The hero of the play, Triboulet, is a historical character during the reigns of Louis XII and Francis I of France. Triboulet is a hunch-backed court jester, through whose words Hugo attacks contemporary society. The king is a profligate and a womanizer, constantly looking for new conquests. The king having set his sights on a new mistress, the Countess de Cossé, Triboulet encourages the queen to kill her husband. Triboulet is despised by the courtiers, who plot to abduct the young woman living with him whom they assume to be his mistress. Suddenly the Comte de Saint-Vallier—whose daughter, Diane de Poitiers, had been seduced by the king—appears to demand compensation. The king and Triboulet mock him, upon which the aristocrat curses them.

Returning home, Triboulet cannot put the curse out of his mind. He meets a stranger on the street, Saltabadil, who offers his services to right the jester's wrongs. Triboulet declines and goes back to the house where he conceals from the world his daughter Blanche. Knowing the character of the king and the nobility, he wants to protect her from seduction and only lets her out to attend mass. Blanche is pleased to receive a visit from her father but does not tell him that she has fallen in love with an unknown man who has seen her in church. Hearing noises in the street Triboulet rushes out to investigate, at which point the king enters the house in disguise; he and Blanche profess their love. The king leaves again, but in the street the jester encounters a group of courtiers. They claim that, in accordance with the earlier plan of the jester they want to abduct Madame de Cossé. In fact, they have come after Blanche whom they believe to be Triboulet's mistress. This is to be the revenge of the courtiers on the jester. They trick him into wearing a mask blindfold and run off with the girl. When he hears her voice in the distance he realises what has happened.

The next day the courtiers prevent Triboulet from entering the room in which Blanche is with the king. When she emerges she tells her father the whole story, which makes the jester determined to take revenge. As Saint-Vallier is taken to his execution Triboulet replies that the curse will soon act on the king. He goes to Saltabadil at an inn by the Seine and pays half the money for the murder. The king also arrives at the inn, where he waits for Maguelonne, the assassin's sister. When the monarch goes to sleep, Saltabadil plans to deal the fatal blow, but Maguelonne asks him to spare the man who has charmed her and instead to kill a random stranger and give that body to the jester. Blanche overhears and can see that the king is unfaithful but decides to save him by sacrificing herself. She enters and is mortally wounded.

In the final act, it is midnight and a storm is passing. Triboulet returns to collect his prize in a sack and refuses Saltabadil's offer to help him throw it in the river, but just as he is about to do so, he hears the king's voice singing and realizes he has been duped. As lightning flashes, he opens the sack and sees that the body in it is his daughter; after asking forgiveness of him, she dies. A crowd is attracted by Triboulet's cries and believes he has killed someone, but a woman stops them from taking him away. A doctor also arrives at the scene and pronounces Blanche dead. Triboulet collapses, exclaiming "J'ai tué mon enfant!" ("I have killed my child!").

== Background ==
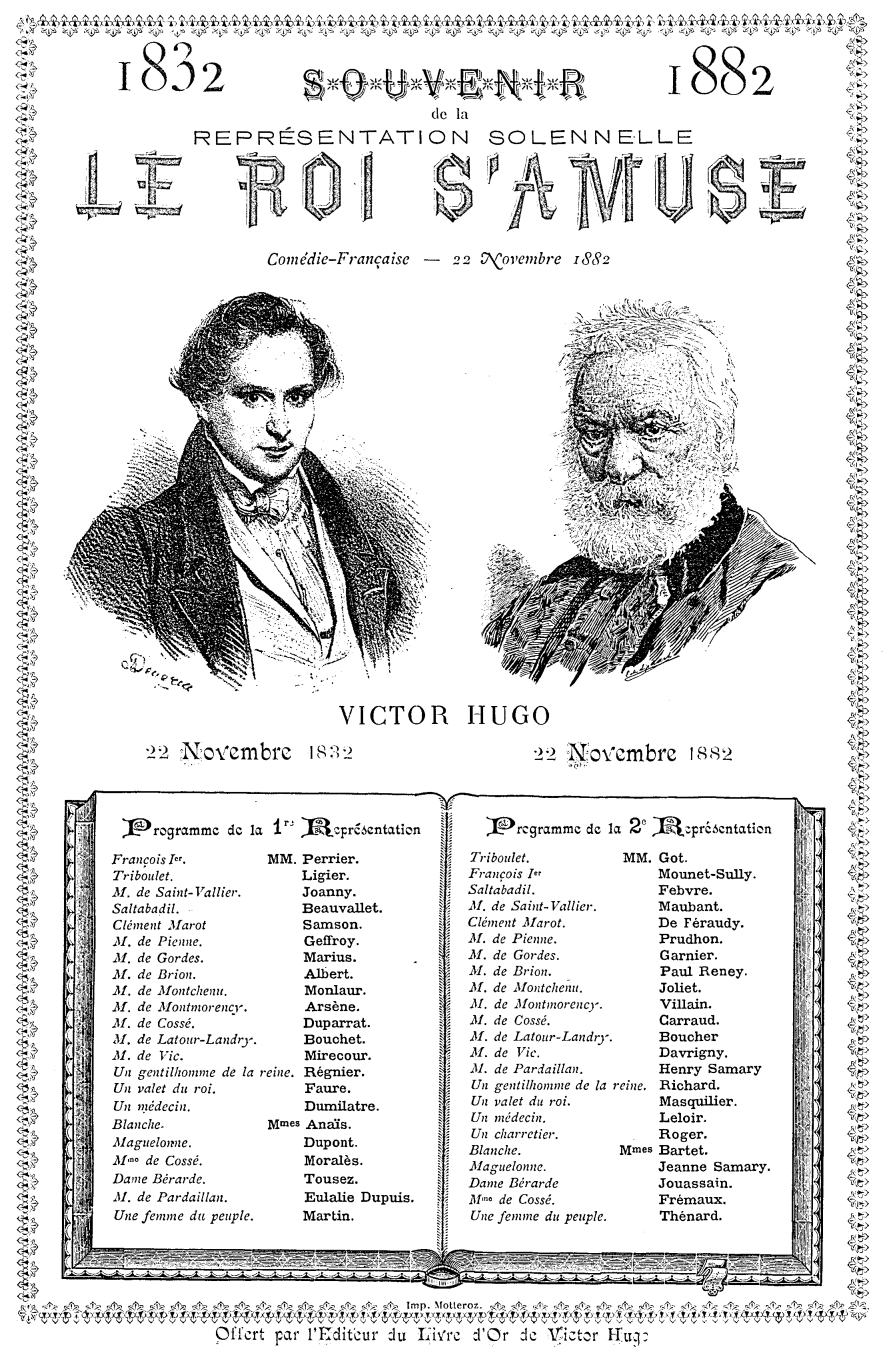
Fiftieth anniversary production of Le Roi s'amuse at the Comédie-Française.

In his preface to the play, the author notes that Triboulet "hates the king because he is king; hates the nobles because they are nobles and hates men because they don't all have a hump-back... he corrupts the king and brutalizes him, urging him on to tyranny, ignorance and vice, dragging him through the gentlemen's families, pointing out a woman to seduce, a sister to kidnap, a girl to dishonour...".

As a victim of royal despotism, the character of the deformed Triboulet is a precursor of the disfigured Gwynplaine in Hugo's 1869 novel The Man Who Laughs (L'Homme qui rit); in Act 2 Scene 1, Triboulet says « Je suis l'homme qui rit, il est l'homme qui tue ». ("I am the man who laughs, he [Saltabadil] is the man who kills.")

While it depicts the escapades of Francis I of France, censors of the time believed that the play also contained insulting references to King Louis-Philippe and a ministerial decree banned it after one performance in 1832. The lawsuit that Hugo brought to permit further performances of the play propelled him into celebrity as a defender of freedom of speech in France, which had been liberalized by the 'Charte-Vérité' of 1830. He lost the suit, however, was forced to pay costs and the play was banned for another 50 years.

The second performance of Le roi s'amuse took place in 1882 at the Comédie-Française on the play's 50th anniversary, with Mounet-Sully as François 1er, Got as Triboulet and Julia Bartet as his daughter Blanche. There were 19 performances that year and 28 more in 1883. The reviewer in Les Annales noted the irony of the fact that the opera Rigoletto, based so closely on the play, had been performed at two theatres in Paris since 1857 while the play had been forbidden. Léo Delibes wrote incidental music for these performances, consisting of dance music for orchestra in the first act ('Six airs de danse dans le style ancien'), and an old song with mandolin accompaniment ('Quand Bourbon vit Marseille') for De Pienne and Triboulet in the third act. A revival with Roland Bertin (Triboulet) directed by Jean-Luc Boutté was mounted at the Comédie-Française in their 1991–1992 season.

== Adaptations ==
Giuseppe Verdi's 1851 opera Rigoletto is based on Hugo's play, which the librettist Piave followed closely in his Italian translation. Censorship by the Austrian authorities in Venice led them to move the action from France to Mantua, the characters François 1er, Triboulet, Blanche, M de Saint Vallier, Saltabadil, Maguelonne becoming the Duke of Mantua, Rigoletto, Gilda, Count Monterone, Sparafucile, Maddalena.

In 1918 an Austrian film Rigoletto was made, starring Hermann Benke and Liane Haid. The 1941 film Il re si diverte is also an adaptation of Hugo's play, and starred Michel Simon as the jester.

Tony Harrison translated and adapted the work for the National Theatre in London in 1996, as The Prince's Play, set in Victorian London, with the central character (played by Ken Stott) now a comic at the court of Victoria and the philanderer villain the future Edward VII. The play has been published by Faber and Faber.

A simplified version of the plot is used by Damon Runyon to grisly effect in his story "Sense of Humour" (from the collection Furthermore (1938).

== See also ==
- Censorship in France
