= Triboulet =

French jester (1479–1536)

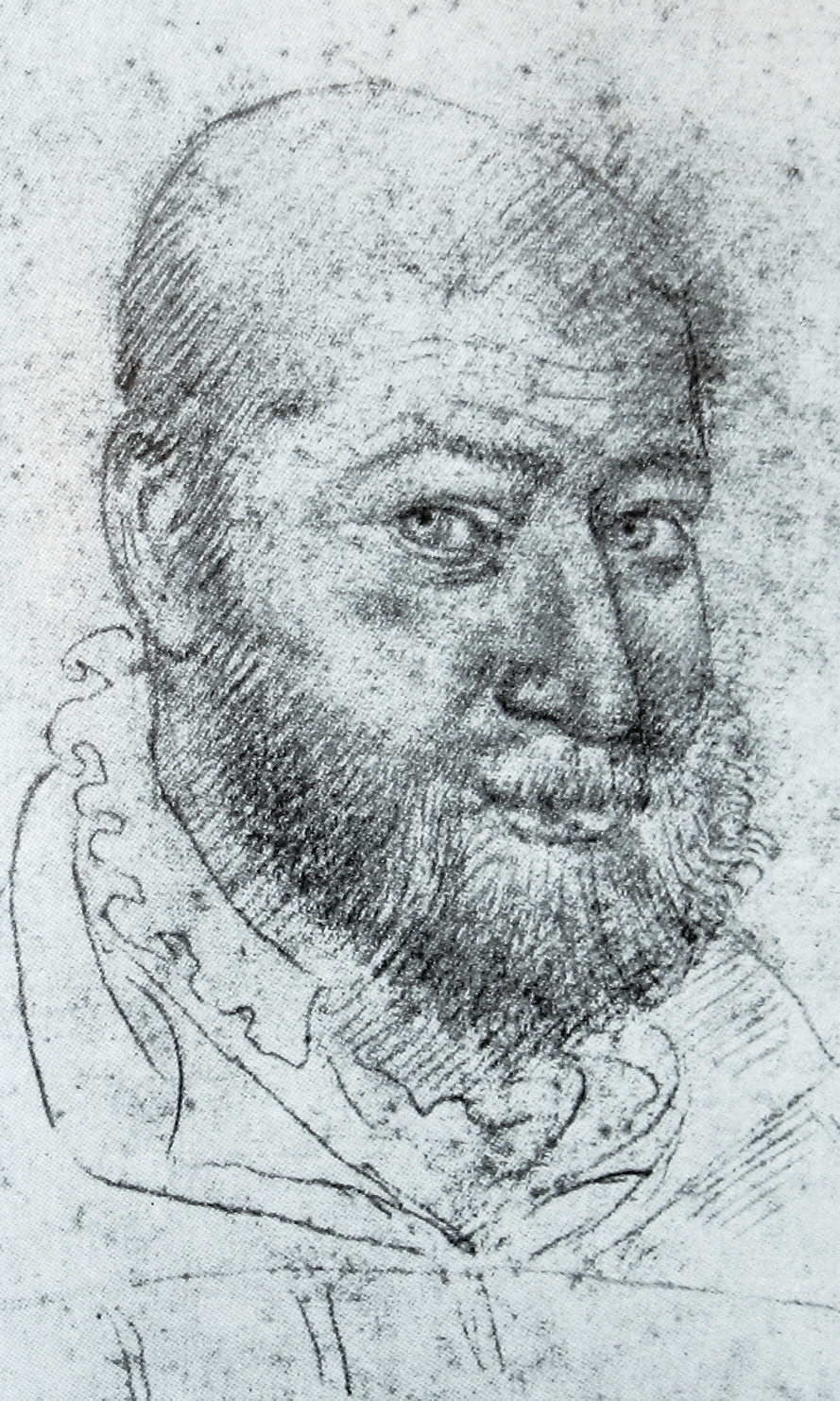
- Portrait, c. 1550, by Jean Clouet
- Born: 1479
- Died: 1536 (aged 56–57)
- Other name: Le Févrial
- Occupation: Jester

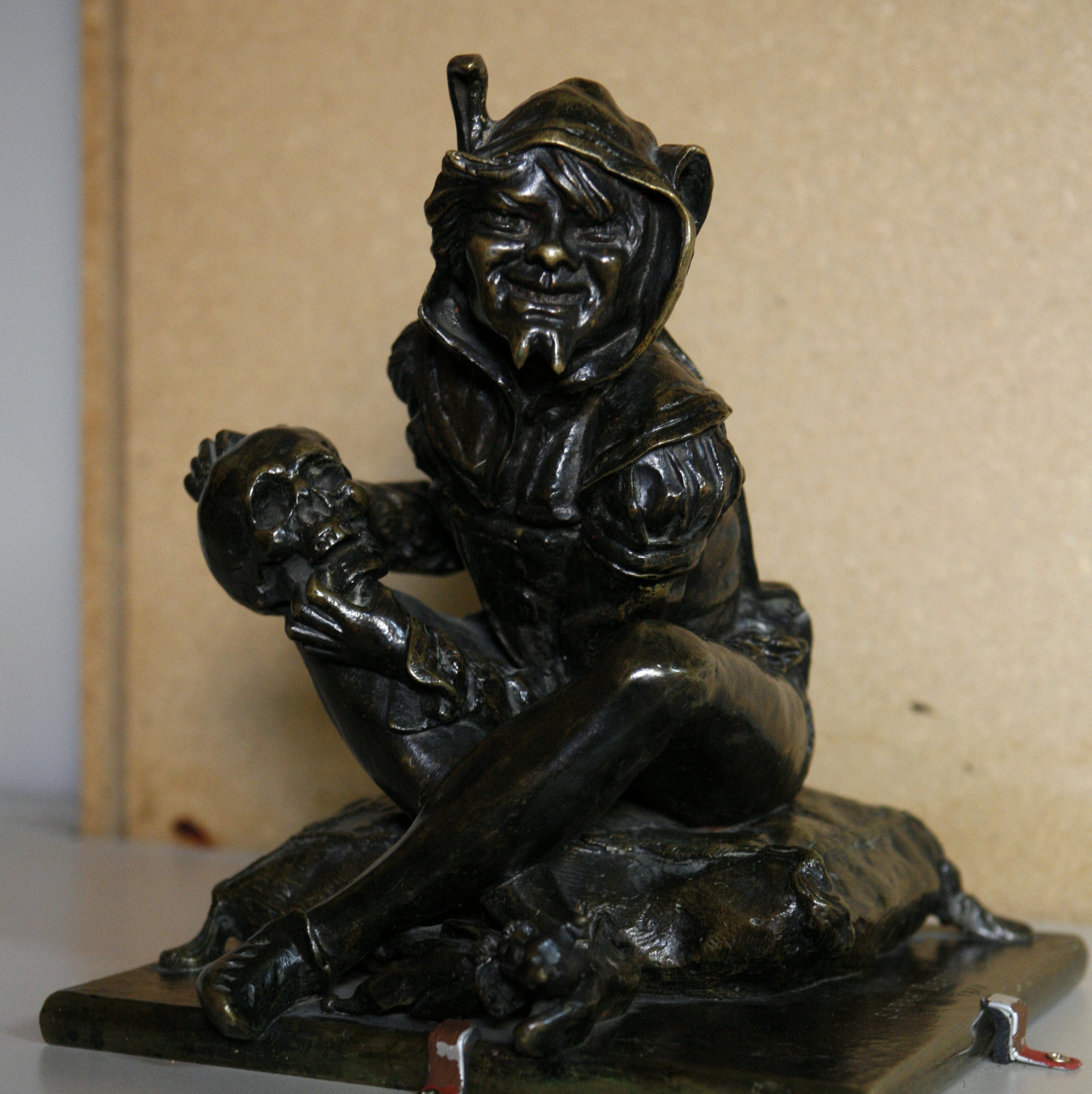
The Triboulet of Hugo's Le Roi s'amuse (The Fool and Death by Sarah Bernhardt)

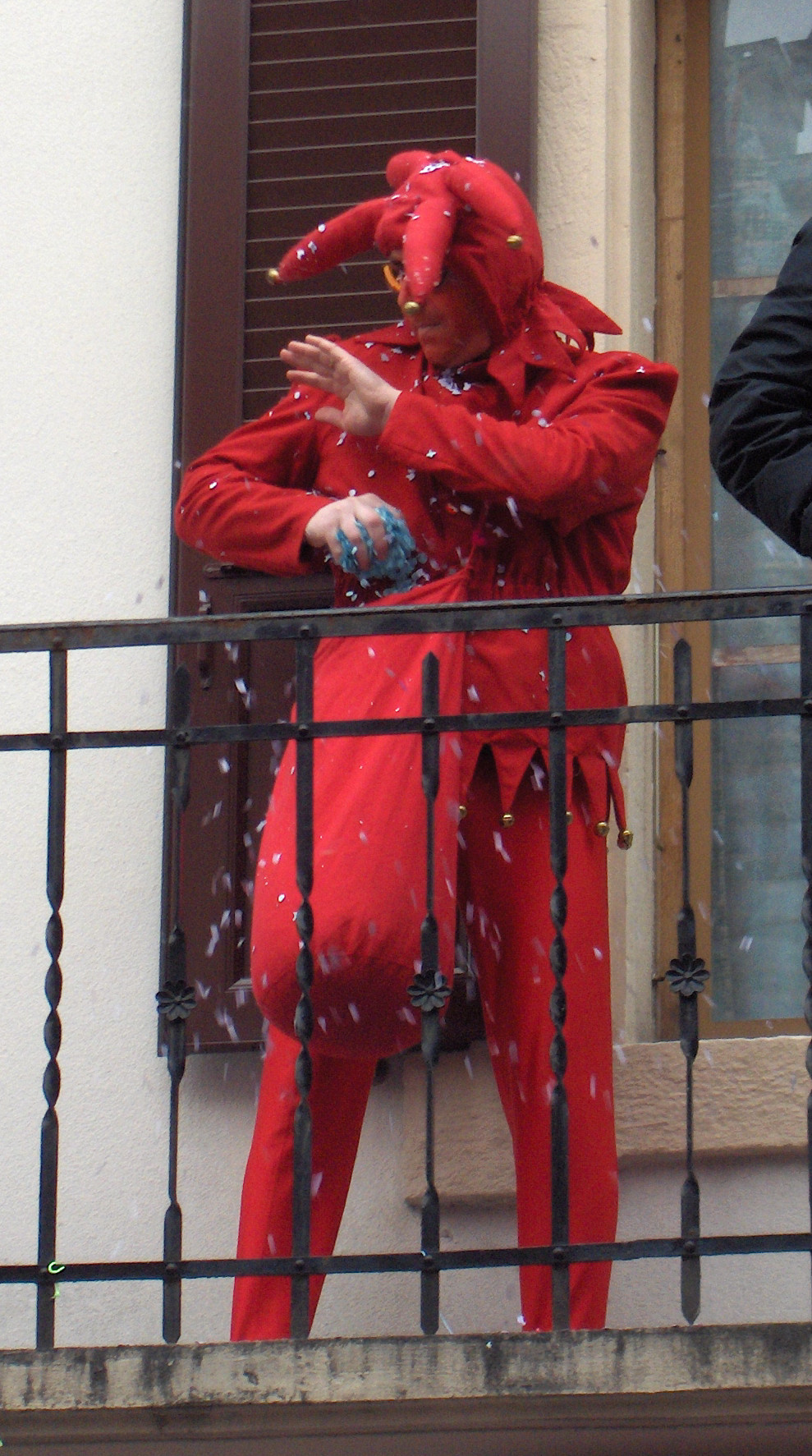
A triboulet at the Monthey carnival

Triboulet (1479–1536), also known as Le Févrial or under his family name Ferrial, (Note: Some modern sources claim that Triboulet was named "Nicolas Ferrial"; however, accounts by the court of Francis I mention "Nicolas Le Feurial, brother of Triboullet" besides the jester himself.) was a French jester for King Francis I.

== Biography ==
Little biographical information is available about Triboulet. It is known that in the Kingdom of France, there have been at least three jesters referred to as "Triboulet", with the first one serving René of Anjou and being also a playwright. The second Triboulet served Louis XII and died during his reign; the third served Francis I (and possibly also Louis XII), and the two fools were later confused as one person.

According to Jean Marot, historiographer of Louis XII, this king's Triboulet had a physical deformity and was "as wise at thirty as the day he was born". When he died in the reign of Louis XII, Marot wrote a lengthy epitaph, describing the fool's talents as an entertainer, mime, dancer, and (a bad) musician, and above all, "a man of words". Quickly after his death, this Triboulet became popular as a fictionalized character to whom numerous anecdotes and witticisms have been attributed, some copied from Italian sources like Ludovico Ariosto.

Ferrial was born in France in 1479. In unknown circumstances, Ferrial found purpose in life as professional jester to King Francis I (and perhaps also earlier for Louis XII), who kept him on at court, together with François Bourcier, "governor of Triboulet" and his brother, Nicolas Le Feurial. He was likely the Triboulet who accompanied Francis I on his Italy campaign of 1515. Poet Jean Visagier published two epitaphs of the third Triboulet in 1538.

== Legacy ==
- Triboulet appears as a character in the Victor Hugo play Le roi s'amuse, and in the Verdi opera inspired by the play, Rigoletto.
- Triboulet appears as a character in François Rabelais' novels Gargantua and Pantagruel.
- François I^{er} et Triboulet (The King and the Jester) is a surviving 1907 short film by Georges Méliès.
- Triboulet is the subject of French writer Michel Zevaco's novel Triboulet.
- Triboulet appears as a joker card in the 2024 video game, Balatro.
