= Cerebral rubicon =

The cerebral rubicon is a disused concept in paleoanthropology that proposed a minimum cranial capacity as the decisive threshold for assigning hominins to the genus Homo. The idea was introduced in the early 20th century by Scottish anthropologist Sir Arthur Keith, who argued that a brain volume of at least 750 cubic centimeters marked the point separating early humans from non-human primates and earlier australopithecine ancestors. His proposal reflected contemporary assumptions that brain size directly correlated with intelligence and evolutionary progress.

For much of the early and mid-20th century, the cerebral rubicon served as a convenient benchmark in debates over fossil classification, with specimens exceeding the cutoff generally accepted as human. The discovery of Homo habilis in 1964, however, disrupted this framework, as fossils with capacities well below 750 cc were now included within Homo. This led to lowering the threshold and supplementing it with other traits, such as bipedalism and tool use.

By the late 20th century, fixed cranial capacity thresholds had been largely abandoned. Fossil evidence revealed that brain size increases were irregular, geographically variable, and restricted to particular lineages rather than occurring as a linear trend. Small-brained hominins such as Homo floresiensis and Homo naledi persisted until relatively recent times, while substantial enlargement became apparent only in later species such as Neanderthals and modern humans. Modern paleoanthropology treats the cerebral rubicon as obsolete, favoring multifactorial approaches that integrate anatomy, behavior, and archaeology rather than relying on single-trait criteria.

== Origin ==
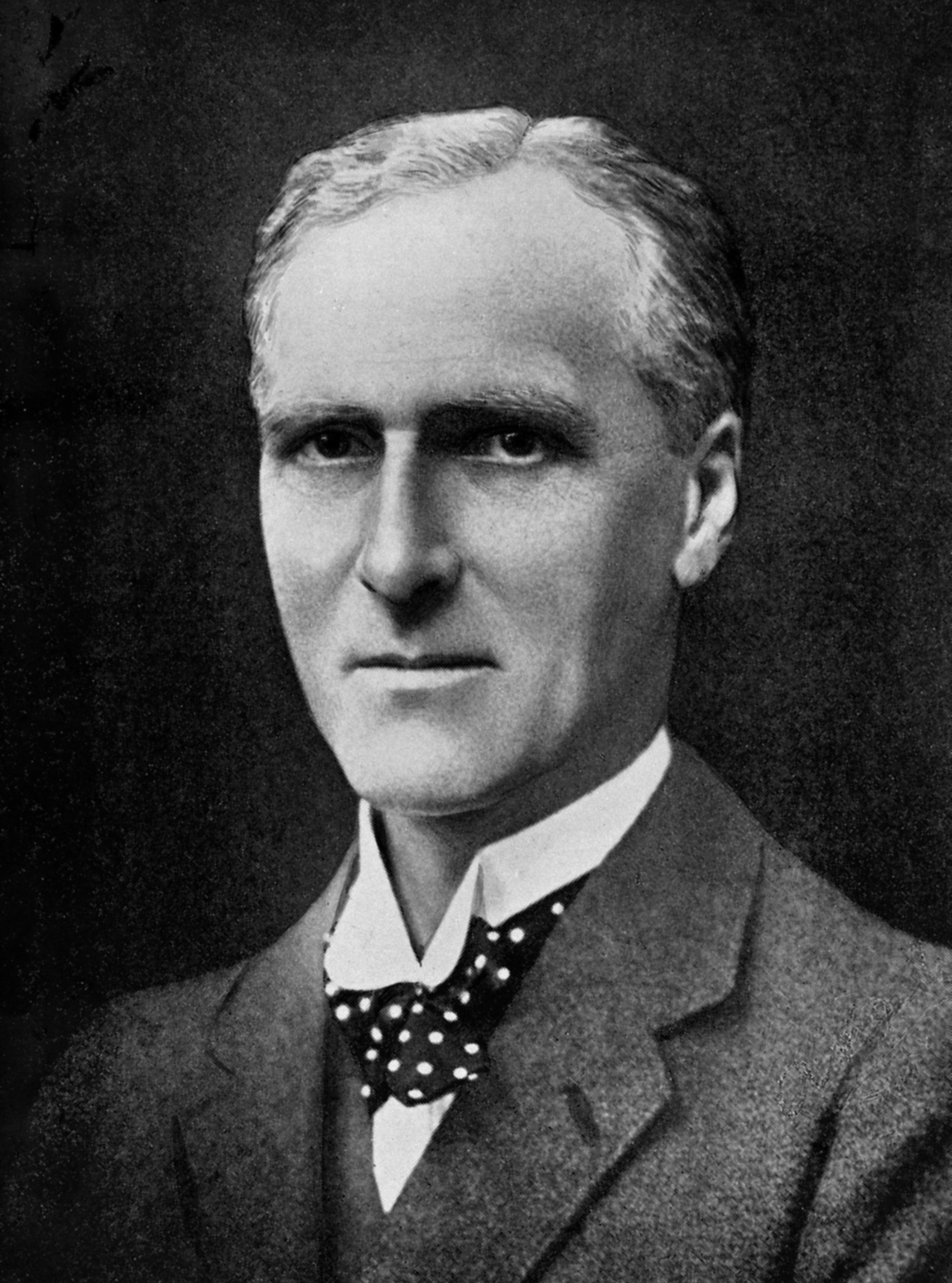
Sir Arthur Keith, who introduced the concept of the cerebral rubicon

The phrase "cerebral rubicon" invokes the idiom "crossing the Rubicon," referring to Julius Caesar's illegal passage of the Rubicon River in 49 BCE, an act that marked the point of no return for his political revolution. In the context of human evolution, the metaphor suggested that once a hominin lineage exceeded a critical brain volume, it had passed an equally irreversible threshold into the genus Homo.

Keith's proposal reflected broader early 20th-century efforts to define human ancestry in simple, measurable terms. At the time, brain enlargement was widely regarded as a consistent, progressive trend in human evolution. Early paleoanthropologists commonly treated cranial capacity as a direct indicator of intelligence and evolutionary advancement, even though later research has shown that increases in hominin brain size were irregular and episodic rather than strictly linear.

== Historical use and significance ==
Throughout the early and mid-20th century, anthropologists such as Keith treated cranial capacity as a primary diagnostic trait distinguishing early humans from other primates. When he proposed the cerebral rubicon, Keith had few hominin fossils to anchor the boundary. Instead, he chose 750 cc as an arbitrary midpoint by comparing gorilla brain volumes with what he described as the "lowest aborigine" brain measurement. In A New Theory of Human Evolution (1948) he wrote:

"The Rubicon between apehood and manhood, so far as concerns brain volume, lies somewhere between the sum for the highest gorilla (650 c.c.) and the lowest aborigine (855 c.c.). On the strength of such evidence as is available to me at present I would say that the Rubicon lies somewhere between 700 c.c. and 800 c.c.; to be more precise, I would say that any group of the great Primates which has attained a mean brain volume of 750 c.c. and over should no longer be regarded as anthropoid, but as human."

This reasoning reflected the prevailing belief in a linear, progressive evolution of intelligence alongside brain enlargement, but it was also an example of early 20th-century anthropological assumptions, including now-discredited ideas of racial hierarchy that used cranial capacity as a proxy for intelligence.

The 750 cc threshold quickly became a convenient benchmark in fossil debates. Hominin remains that exceeded it, such as "Java Man" (Pithecanthropus erectus, later subsumed into Homo erectus), were accepted as human, while smaller-brained specimens were relegated to other categories. For decades, paleoanthropologists used this cutoff to structure the genus Homo in a way that seemed neat and measurable.

However, the 1964 discovery and naming of Homo habilis at Olduvai Gorge disrupted this framework. Louis Leakey and colleagues described fossils with cranial capacities as low as 510–600 cc, well below Keith's original 750 cc threshold. To include habilis within Homo, paleoanthropologists lowered the rubicon to 600 cc and supplemented it with other criteria, such as bipedal gait and a human-like "precision grip." Yet subsequent studies of habilis remains, such as the primitive limb proportions of specimen OH 62, challenged these assumptions, raising questions about the degree to which habilis was an obligate biped or capable of complex manual manipulation. These reassessments weakened both the rubicon and the notion that Homo could be defined by any single anatomical or behavioral criterion.

== Decline and reassessment ==
By the late 20th century, the use of fixed cranial capacity thresholds to define the genus Homo had been largely abandoned. Early classifications that emphasized brain size were based on the assumption that larger brains correlated directly with traits associated with modern humans. However, subsequent fossil discoveries have shown that hominins with endocranial volumes below the historically proposed threshold of 750 cc may exhibit stone tool manufacture, habitual bipedalism, and complex social organization. These findings suggest that brain size alone is neither a necessary nor sufficient criterion for inclusion in Homo.

Variation in brain size among both early and late hominin species further challenges linear models of encephalization. Fossils from Dmanisi (~1.9 Ma), for example, show endocranial volumes averaging 640 cc, with some individuals as small as 546 cc, yet they are classified within Homo on the basis of tool use and postcranial anatomy. Similarly, small-brained hominins such as Homo floresiensis (Liang Bua fossils ~100–60 ka; associated tools to ~50 ka) and Homo naledi (~335–236 ka) persisted into the Late Pleistocene despite brain sizes more typical of australopiths. These cases suggest that increases in cranial capacity were irregular and geographically variable rather than following a uniform trajectory.

In addition to this variability, comparative studies confirm that significant increases in average brain size appear relatively late in the fossil record and are largely restricted to particular lineages. Rightmire (2004) reports that Homo erectus crania average about 970 cc, with only slight increases across more than a million years. In contrast, Middle Pleistocene specimens attributed to Homo heidelbergensis average around 1,200 cc, a marked jump not accounted for by body size scaling alone. Rightmire interprets this as a speciation event, linking greater encephalization with morphological and behavioral changes, such as increasingly sophisticated Acheulean technologies.

Later species, including Neanderthals (≈1,415 cc) and early modern humans (≈1,450 cc), exhibit the largest mean volumes. Yet the long persistence of small-brained populations, coupled with the irregular timing of enlargement, underscores that traits once treated as defining markers of Homo did not arise together. Features such as elongated legs, reduced sexual dimorphism, extended life history, and cooperative behaviors emerged at different times in different taxa, reflecting mosaic rather than coordinated evolution. As Tattersall (2023) argues, current paleoanthropology favors multifactorial approaches that integrate postcranial anatomy, behavior, and archaeological evidence rather than relying on single-trait thresholds.

== See also ==
- Human evolution
- Timeline of human evolution
- Brain size
