= Polyamine-modulated factor 1 =

Protein found in humans

PMF1

Identifiers
- Aliases: PMF1, polyamine modulated factor 1
- External IDs: OMIM: 609176; MGI: 1914287; GeneCards: PMF1

Gene location (Human)
Chr.	Chromosome 1 (human)
Band	1q22	Start	156,212,993 bp
Band	1q22	End	156,240,042 bp

Gene location (Mouse)
Chr.	Chromosome 3 (mouse)
Band	3|3 F1	Start	88,301,450 bp
Band	3|3 F1	End	88,317,638 bp
RNA expression pattern
Bgee	Human / Mouse (ortholog); Top expressed in: muscle of thigh; apex of heart; right lobe of thyroid gland; left lobe of thyroid gland; gastrocnemius muscle; right auricle of heart; ectocervix; skin of leg; left ventricle; granulocyte / Top expressed in: yolk sac; embryo; embryo; ventricular zone; tibiofemoral joint; blastocyst; internal carotid artery; lip; morula; epiblast; More reference expression data
BioGPS	n/a
Gene ontology
Molecular function	transcription coactivator activity; leucine zipper domain binding; protein binding
Cellular component	chromosome; cytosol; MIS12/MIND type complex; chromosome, centromeric region; nucleus; kinetochore; transcription regulator complex; nucleoplasm; Golgi apparatus; intracellular membrane-bounded organelle; nuclear MIS12/MIND complex
Biological process	chromosome segregation; cell division; cell cycle; regulation of transcription, DNA-templated; transcription by RNA polymerase II; transcription, DNA-templated; positive regulation of nucleic acid-templated transcription
Sources:Amigo / QuickGO
Orthologs
Databases	NCBI: entry; OMA: entry
Species	Human	Mouse
Entrez	11243	67037
Ensembl	ENSG00000160783	ENSMUSG00000028066
UniProt	Q6P1K2	Q9CPV5
RefSeq (mRNA)	NM_007221; NM_001199653; NM_001199654	NM_025928; NM_001310605
RefSeq (protein)	NP_001186582; NP_001186583; NP_009152	NP_001297534; NP_080204
Location (UCSC)	Chr 1: 156.21 – 156.24 Mb	Chr 3: 88.3 – 88.32 Mb
PubMed search
- Wikidata
View/Edit Human	View/Edit Mouse

Polyamine-modulated factor 1 is a protein that in humans is encoded by the PMF1 gene.

== Interactions ==
Polyamine-modulated factor 1 has been shown to interact with MIS12.
