= Rats of Shah Dola =

People with microcephaly in Gujrat City, Pakistan

Photograph of Chuas taken in 1928.

Chuas or rat-children are children and adults with microcephaly who are exploited as beggars in the Punjab region. They are associated with the Shrine of Shah Dola in Gujrat City, Pakistan, where they were first recorded as 'chuhas' in 1839. As of 2009, only one or two chuas remain at the shrine, and they are more frequently encountered traveling the Grand Trunk Road between Islamabad and Lahore as itinerant beggars instead. It is unknown how chuas became associated with Shah Dola, and various local legends and stories exist. Most involve women seeking a cure for infertility who produce chuas after receiving prayers from the holy man.

Speculation that chuas were a result of intentionally deforming the skulls of developing infants began in the mid-19th century and continues today. Such intentional deformation to produce microcephaly has never been witnessed, and the clamps, molds, or other instruments used for such a practice have never been found. It is unclear if such a practice is even possible without causing fatal injury to the growing brain.

== Terminology ==
The name chua is from the Punjabi word for rat, چوہا (Cẖwḥạ), and is variously rendered in English as chua, chuha, chuhar, chuva, chuwa, or choha, among others. The name of the holy man or saint also varies, appearing in various sources as Shah Dola, Shahdaula, Shawdowla, Shah Daula, Daula Shah, Daulah, Daulat, Dawlah, Dawlat, Dhola, Dowla, or Dula.

== History ==
Shah Dola settled in Gujrat sometime in the late 16th century, though sources differ on specific dates. He is credited with the building of the various structures, charitable work, and caring for animals and people with disabilities.

Chuas were first reported at the shrine in January 1839 by Shahamat Ali, complete with a description of the legend of fertility prayers as their origin. They became an object of study for European academics starting in the mid-19th century, during which a population varying from 10-20 chuas was reported. During this time, speculation of artificial deformation by means of 'clay cups' and later 'iron vessels' began to appear in some studies, though the idea was doubted by some academics.

The number of chuas grew in the late-19th century, by 1891 there were 100 chuas at the shrine. In 1902 the superintendent of the Lahore Lunatic Asylum and the Inspector-General of hospitals in Punjab visited the shrine, they concluded that the skull deformities were not artificial and that conditions in the shrine were acceptable enough that the chuas could remain.

In 1969, the Punjab Auqaf and Religious Affairs Department took over administration of the shrine and forbade the alleged practice of artificial deformation, as well as the abandonment of microcephalic children to the shrine. In the 1970s and 80s the department was reported to sometimes allow chuas at the shrine to be hired out as itinerant beggars for an annual fee, fulfilling minor religious roles as fakirs or assistants to fakirs.

In 2006, broadcaster Armand Marie Leroi visited the shrine for the documentary series What Makes Us Human and found only one chua remaining, a 30-year old woman called Nazia. Leroi wrote that the prevalence of microcephaly seems to be related to genetics, noting it's above average rates in Pakistani immigrant communities in the United Kingdom and that inbreeding via cousin-marriage could explain its increased presence.

== In popular culture ==
- Flora Annie Steel's 1893 collection From the Five Rivers, feature the short story "Shah Sujah's Mouse", which follows a Chua.
- In the 1940's Saadat Hasan Manto wrote a short story inverting the traditional tales about Shah Dola. In Manto's story a woman visiting Shah Dola is frightened by the chuas but gives birth to a normal child whom she dedicates to the shrine, only for her subsequent children born outside to have microcephaly.
- Writer Ved Mehta mentioned the rats of Shah Dola in his 1972 work Daddyji.
