= Triboulet (playwright) =

French dramaturge

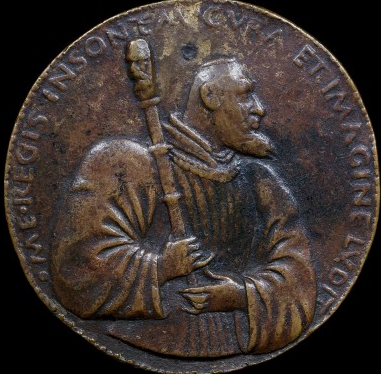
1461 medal depicting Triboulet

Triboulet (fl. 1447–1479) was a jester and comedy playwright for René of Anjou. There have been at least three Triboulets, as homonymy was widespread among French court jesters. The Triboulet for René of Anjou was the first one. The name, equivalent to modern French phrase souffre-douleur ("punchbag"), comes from the archaic French verb tribouler.

== Works mentioning biography ==
Triboulet's biography was summarized by Maurice Lever. Medievalist Bruno Roy, confirmed the intuitions of Gustave Cohen and Eugénie Droz, studying the jester-playwright in his articles and book. A bilingual edition of the works by Triboulet was published by Thierry Martin.

== Career ==
Having microcephaly and dwarfism, Triboulet was predisposed to novelty entertainment. In the beginning at the court, he had a character playing as a governor named Jacquet and another named Nicolas de Haultet. Throughout his career, he would have two servants: his wife La Triboulette and her mother, who both lived in the court.

Triboulet led a theatrical troupe and was a praised author of farces and sotties. He composed several comic pieces, five of which were preserved: the sotties Roi des Sots (c. 1454), La Farce de maître Pathelin (c. 1457 (Note: According to Halina Lewicka (Études sur l’ancienne farce française, Klincksieck, 1974, p. 100), Pathelin was written after 1456, and Guillaume Alécis had it in mind while he made Feintes du monde, shortly after 1460.)), Vigiles Triboulet (c. 1458), Copieurs et lardeurs (c. 1461), and Sots qui corrigent le magnificat (c. 1462). At the end of his career, he wrote Débat de Triboulet et de la Mort (c. 1480).

René of Anjou rewarded himself by dressing up as a king, marrying him with the greatest pomp on 30 August 1452, and having his medal engraved in 1461. Charles gifted Triboulet a magnificent mare.

The sottie Vigiles Triboulet describes the overall language of a work composed by Villon, titled Oncques maistre Françoys Villon / Ne composa si bon jargon. This implies that the two authors could have met at the Anjou court in 1457, but the date of this sottie is controversial The exact date and author of the Stockholm manuscript jargon ballads is uncertain.
