= ZWINT =

Protein-coding gene in the species Homo sapiens

Identifiers
- Aliases: ZWINT, HZwint-1, KNTC2AP, ZWINT1, SIP30, ZW10 interacting kinetochore protein
- External IDs: OMIM: 609177; MGI: 1289227; GeneCards: ZWINT

Gene location (Human)
Chr.	Chromosome 10 (human)
Band	10q21.1	Start	56,357,227 bp
Band	10q21.1	End	56,361,273 bp

Gene location (Mouse)
Chr.	Chromosome 10 (mouse)
Band	10 B5.3|10 37.15 cM	Start	72,490,677 bp
Band	10 B5.3|10 37.15 cM	End	72,510,796 bp
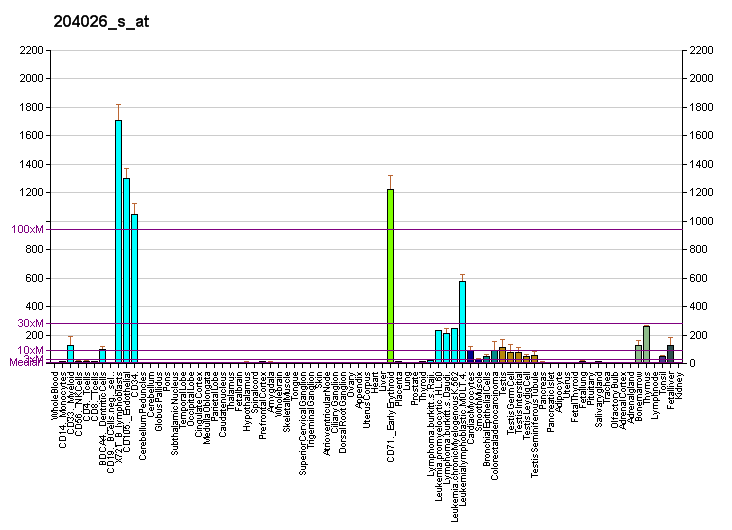
RNA expression pattern
Bgee	Human / Mouse (ortholog); Top expressed in: oocyte; secondary oocyte; ventricular zone; embryo; ganglionic eminence; trabecular bone; bone marrow; gonad; rectum; gingival epithelium / Top expressed in: ventromedial nucleus; paraventricular nucleus of hypothalamus; lateral hypothalamus; medial vestibular nucleus; entorhinal cortex; superior colliculus; perirhinal cortex; mammillary body; inferior colliculi; arcuate nucleus; More reference expression data
BioGPS	More reference expression data
Gene ontology
Molecular function	protein binding; protein N-terminus binding
Cellular component	cytoplasm; neuron projection; dendrite; chromosome, centromeric region; intracellular membrane-bounded organelle; kinetochore; chromosome; nucleus; nucleoplasm; cytosol; nuclear body
Biological process	mitotic sister chromatid segregation; mitotic cell cycle checkpoint signaling; cell division; cell cycle; establishment of localization in cell
Sources:Amigo / QuickGO
Orthologs
Databases	NCBI: entry; OMA: entry
Species	Human	Mouse
Entrez	11130	52696
Ensembl	ENSG00000122952	ENSMUSG00000019923
UniProt	O95229	Q9CQU5
RefSeq (mRNA)	NM_001005413; NM_001005414; NM_007057; NM_032997	NM_001293683; NM_001293684; NM_025635
RefSeq (protein)	NP_001005413; NP_008988; NP_127490	NP_001280612; NP_001280613; NP_079911
Location (UCSC)	Chr 10: 56.36 – 56.36 Mb	Chr 10: 72.49 – 72.51 Mb
PubMed search
- Wikidata
View/Edit Human	View/Edit Mouse

ZW10 interactor (Zwint-1) is a protein that in humans is encoded by the ZWINT gene.

== Function ==
Zwint-1 is clearly involved in kinetochore function although an exact role is not known. It interacts with ZW10, another kinetochore protein, possibly regulating the association between ZW10 and kinetochores. The encoded protein localizes to prophase kinetochores before ZW10 does and it remains detectable on the kinetochore until late anaphase. It has a uniform distribution in the cytoplasm of interphase cells. Alternatively spliced transcript variants encoding different isoforms have been found for this gene.

== Interactions ==
ZWINT has been shown to interact with MIS12. ZWINT has also been shown to interact with RAB3C
