= Mi-2/NuRD complex =

Protein complex

In the field of molecular biology, the Mi-2/NuRD (Nucleosome Remodeling Deacetylase) complex, is a group of associated proteins with both ATP-dependent chromatin remodeling and histone deacetylase activities. As of 2007, Mi-2/NuRD was the only known protein complex that couples chromatin remodeling ATPase and chromatin deacetylation enzymatic functions.

== Discovery ==
In 1998, several independent groups reported the discovery of multi-enzyme complexes conferring both nucleosome remodelling and histone deacetylation activities. Xue et al first described the human complex as the Nucleosome Remodelling and Deacetylase (NuRD) - this name has since been adopted for homologous complexes in most organisms.

== Composition ==
The NuRD complex contains seven subunits: the histone deacetylase core proteins HDAC1 and HDAC2, the histone-binding proteins RbAp46 and RbAp48, the metastasis-associated proteins MTA1 (or MTA2 / MTA3), the methyl-CpG-binding domain protein MBD3 (or MBD2) and the chromodomain-helicase-DNA-binding protein CHD3 (a.k.a. Mi-2alpha) or CHD4 (a.k.a. Mi-2beta).

NuRD can be subdivided into two discrete subcomplexes which confer neuclosome remodelling or histone deacetylation activity, each of which retains catalytic activity without the presence of the other. The histone deacetylases HDAC1 and HDAC2 and the histone binding proteins RbAp48 and RbAp46 form a core complex shared between NuRD and Sin3-histone deacetylase complexes.

=== NuRD-independent Mi2/CHD4 activity ===
Mi-2/CHD4 may confer NuRD independent transcriptional regulation in some organisms and contexts. For example, in the fly, Drosophila melanogaster, the majority of Mi2 biochemically purifies separately from the rest of the NuRD subunits and profiling of NuRD component binding sites indicates that only a minority of loci are co-occupied by both Mi-2 and HDAC. Similar results are reported in mouse embryonic stem cells where CHD4 shares only a minority of binding loci with core NuRD component, MBD3. Independently of histone deacetylase, Mi-2 knockdown in neuronal tissue results in mis-expression of genes that are normally restricted to germline. A similar observation was made in human erythroid cells, in which CHD4 but not Mi-2 is required for suppression of fetal globin genes.

== Biological functions of NuRD ==
NuRD is traditionally thought of as a primarily repressive complex (in AP-1), and in some contexts it is clear that it does confer this function. For example, NuRD is required to silence genes in neuronal differentiation. However, more recent studies have presented a more nuanced picture of NuRD activity in which it is required for fine-tuning of gene expression during stem cell differentiation to ensure appropriate lineage specification.
