= FAM219A =

Protein-coding gene in the species Homo sapiens

An Error has occurred retrieving Wikidata item for infobox Chromosome 9 open reading frame 25 (C9orf25) is a domain that encodes the FAM219A gene. The terms FAM219A and C9orf25 are aliases and can be used interchangeably. The function of this gene is not yet completely understood.

== Gene ==
Location of C9orf25 on the - strand of Chromosome 9

=== Location ===
In humans, C9orf25 is located at the 9p13.3 position on chromosome 9. The gene is encoded on the sense strand (-) spanning the chromosomal locus from base pair 34,502,909 to 34,398,027. The span of the gene is 104,882 base pairs

=== Transcript variants ===
In humans there are 8 main transcript variants of the FAM219A gene. All of these transcripts have varying lengths and splice sites with transcript variant 1 being the longest and most abundant. Only four of these transcripts encode for a protein product.

== Homology ==
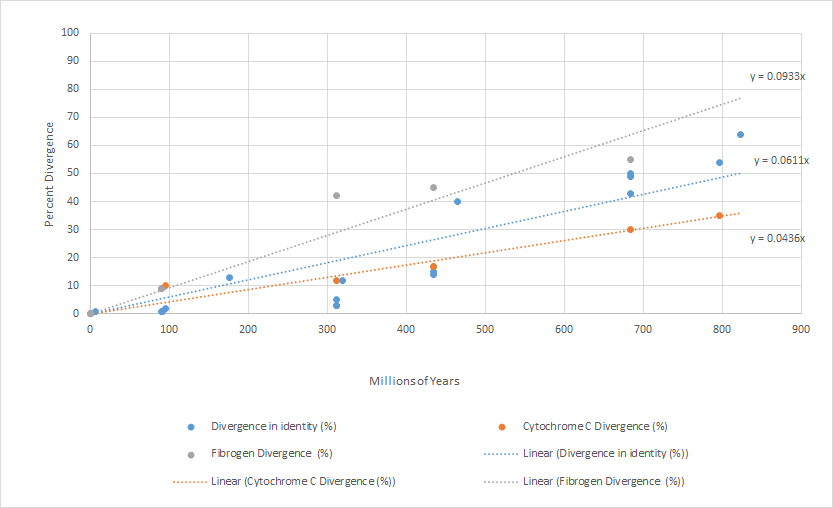
Speed of evolution of C9orf25 in some orthologs compared to evolution of Cytochrome C and Fibrinogen

=== Orthologs ===
The C9orf25 gene has orthologs in a wide variety of Eukaryotic organisms, including invertebrates. This gene has not been found in plants, fungi or protists. C9orf25 is a slowly evolving gene. It is also highly conserved throughout all of its known orthologs.

=== Paralogs ===
C9orf25 has a paralog FAM219B which is located on the long arm of chromosome 9 and is 198 amino acids long. The C9orf25 and FAM219B genes duplicated and diverged between 684 and 797 million years ago.

== Protein ==
=== General properties ===
The C9orf25 protein is composed of 185 amino acids. It has a molecular weight of 20.4 kilodaltons and an isoelectric point of 4.47. It is a member of the FAM219 super family. The entire protein is still considered to be a domain of unknown function.

=== Protein localization ===
C9orf25 has no signal sequence and remains in the cytosol.

=== Conserved motifs and post-translational modifications ===
The following are experimental post-transitional modifications for the C9orf25 protein:

- 6 predicted Serine phosphorylation sites
- 1 predicted Tyrosine phosphorylation site
- 1 predicted prenylation site

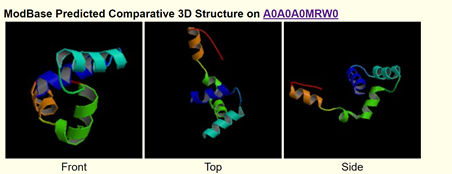
Secondary structure of the FAM219A gene

=== Secondary structure ===
The secondary structure of the gene is predicted to have two stretches of alpha helices and one beta strand. The majority of the secondary structure of gene is random coils.

=== Expression ===
The C9orf25 gene has medium to high expression in most tissues of the body. The gene has particularly high expression in the nervous, digestive and male reproductive systems.

=== Interacting proteins ===
The C9orf25 gene has many different interactions with a variety of other proteins that have an assortment of functions. The main ones that are listed on at least two reviewed sources are shown below.

| Interactor Gene | Full Protein Name | Method | Description | Clinical Significance (Potential) |
|---|---|---|---|---|
| LIMS3 | LIM Zinc finger domain | Two hybrid pooling approach | Senescent cell antigen containing protein | |
| PDE6D | Rhodopsin sensitive cGMP phosphodiesterase subunit | Two hybrid pooling approach | Regulates the activity of the RAS protein in the cytosol | Joubert Syndrome |
| NIPSNAP3A | NipSnap homolog 3A | Two Hybrid | Involved in the Acetylation and phosphorylation process | |
| CSNK1A1 | Casein Kinase 1 Alpha 1 | Two Hybrid | Serine/Threonine protein kinase. Participates in S phase checkpoint arrest by phosphorylating Claspin | NSEOE |
| SPRY2 | Protein Sprouty Homolog 2 | Two Hybrid | Antagonist of fibroblast growth factor | IgA nephropathy 3 |
| BTRC | F-box/WD repeat containing protein | Affinity Capture | Substrate recognition component of SCF ubiquitin-protein ligase (phosphorolation dependent ubiquination) | CD4 (HIV-1) degregation |
| MTA1 | Metastasis Associated Protein 1 | Affinity Capture | Cancer associated. DNA binding transcription factor activity | Esophageal and Breast cancer |
| MTA3 | Metastasis Associated Protein 3 | Affinity Capture | Maintains epithelial architecture. Regulation of E-cadherin levels | Cancers related to epithelial cells |

== Clinical significance ==
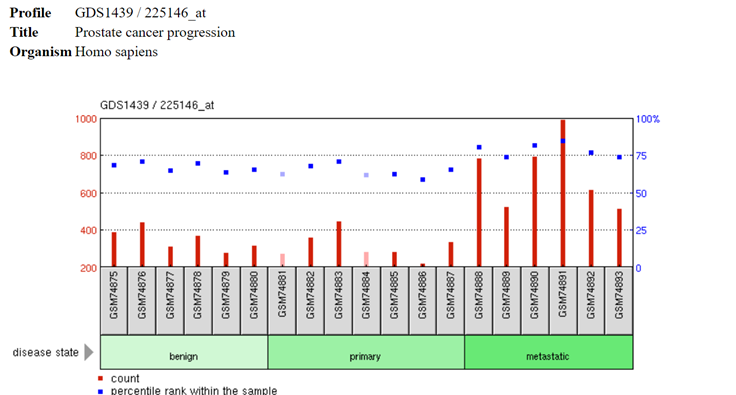
Expression and amount of C9orf25 present in prostate cells

The C9orf25 protein is associated with several disease causing proteins, however does not seem to be responsible for disease on its own. The gene seems to have higher expression in metastatic cells.
