= CKD-506 =

Clinical data
- Other names: CKD506
- Routes of administration: Oral
- Drug class: Histone deacetylase inhibitor; HDAC6 inhibitor

Identifiers
- CAS Number: 2765430-19-9

CKD-506 is a histone deacetylase (HDAC) inhibitor which is under development for the treatment of inflammatory bowel diseases (IBDs) and rheumatoid arthritis. It acts as a selective HDAC6 inhibitor. The drug is taken orally.

== Pharmacology ==
CKD-506 activities
Enzyme	IC_{50} (nM)
HDAC1	>2,000
HDAC2	>2,000
HDAC3	>2,000
HDAC4	>2,000
HDAC5	>2,000
HDAC6	~5
HDAC7	>2,000
HDAC8	>2,000
HDAC9	>2,000
HDAC10	>2,000
HDAC11	>2,000
Refs:

CKD-506 is a selective HDAC6 inhibitor, with an IC_{50} of around 5 nM. It showed greater than 100-fold selectivity for inhibition of HDAC6 over other HDACs, with IC_{50} values of 2,000 to 5,000 nM at HDAC1, HDAC2, HDAC7, and HDAC8 and no significant inhibition of other HDACs including HDAC3, HDAC4, HDAC5, HDAC9, HDAC10, and HDAC11. The drug produces anti-inflammatory effects in animal models of autoimmune diseases such as multiple sclerosis (MS), systemic lupus erythematosus (SLE; lupus), and rheumatoid arthritis. It also shows anti-inflammatory effects and enhances gut barrier function in animal models of inflammatory bowel disease. The pharmacokinetics of CKD-506 in rodents have been described.

== Chemistry ==
The chemical structure of CKD-506 does not yet appear to have been disclosed.

== History and development ==
CKD-506 was first described in the scientific literature by 2017. It was developed by Chong Kun Dang Pharmaceutical. As of August 2022, the drug is in phase 2 clinical trials for both inflammatory bowel diseases and rheumatoid arthritis.

== See also ==
- Histone deacetylase inhibitor
