= MTA3 =

Protein-coding gene in the species Homo sapiens

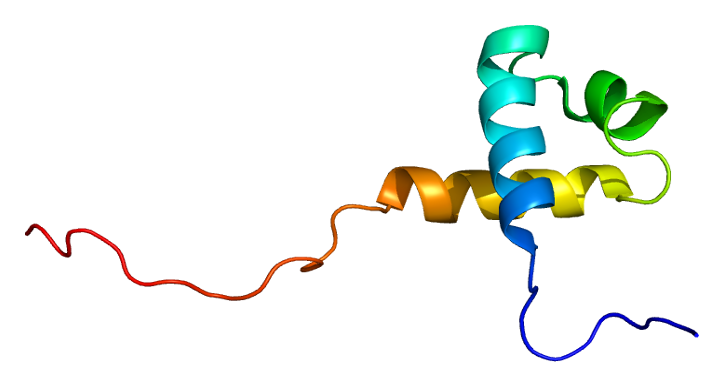

Identifiers
- Aliases: MTA3, metastasis associated 1 family member 3
- External IDs: OMIM: 609050; MGI: 2151172; GeneCards: MTA3

Gene location (Human)
Chr.	Chromosome 2 (human)
Band	2p21	Start	42,494,569 bp
Band	2p21	End	42,756,947 bp

Gene location (Mouse)
Chr.	Chromosome 17 (mouse)
Band	17|17 E4	Start	84,013,592 bp
Band	17|17 E4	End	84,128,945 bp
RNA expression pattern
Bgee	Human / Mouse (ortholog); Top expressed in: right adrenal cortex; left adrenal gland; left adrenal cortex; gonad; epithelium of colon; oocyte; left ovary; right ovary; ventricular zone; secondary oocyte / Top expressed in: zygote; secondary oocyte; morula; primary oocyte; blastocyst; lip; genital tubercle; tail of embryo; blood; primary visual cortex; More reference expression data
BioGPS	n/a
Gene ontology
Molecular function	DNA-binding transcription factor activity; sequence-specific DNA binding; DNA binding; zinc ion binding; chromatin binding; protein binding; metal ion binding; histone deacetylase activity; DNA-binding transcription factor activity, RNA polymerase II-specific; protein-containing complex binding; transcription coactivator activity; transcription corepressor activity; histone deacetylase binding
Cellular component	intracellular membrane-bounded organelle; nucleus; nucleoplasm; cytoplasm; NuRD complex
Biological process	negative regulation of transcription, DNA-templated; regulation of transcription, DNA-templated; histone deacetylation; positive regulation of cell population proliferation; positive regulation of G2/M transition of mitotic cell cycle; regulation of transcription by RNA polymerase II; negative regulation of transcription by RNA polymerase II; positive regulation of nucleic acid-templated transcription
Sources:Amigo / QuickGO
Orthologs
Databases	NCBI: entry; OMA: entry
Species	Human	Mouse
Entrez	57504	116871
Ensembl	ENSG00000057935	ENSMUSG00000055817
UniProt	Q9BTC8	Q924K8
RefSeq (mRNA)	NM_001282755; NM_001282756; NM_020744; NM_001330442; NM_001330443 NM_001330444	NM_001171052; NM_001171053; NM_001171054; NM_054082; NM_001379388 NM_001379389; NM_001379390; NM_001379391; NM_001379392
RefSeq (protein)	NP_001269684; NP_001269685; NP_001317371; NP_001317372; NP_001317373 NP_065795	NP_001164523; NP_001164524; NP_001164525; NP_473423; NP_001366317 NP_001366318; NP_001366319; NP_001366320; NP_001366321
Location (UCSC)	Chr 2: 42.49 – 42.76 Mb	Chr 17: 84.01 – 84.13 Mb
PubMed search
- Wikidata
View/Edit Human	View/Edit Mouse

Metastasis-associated protein MTA3 is a protein that in humans is encoded by the MTA3 gene. MTA3 protein localizes in the nucleus as well as in other cellular compartments MTA3 is a component of the nucleosome remodeling and deacetylate (NuRD) complex and participates in gene expression. The expression pattern of MTA3 is opposite to that of MTA1 and MTA2 during mammary gland tumorigenesis. However, MTA3 is also overexpressed in a variety of human cancers.

== Discovery ==
Mouse Mta3 was initially identified as a partial cDNA with open reading frames in screening of a mouse keratinocyte cDNA library with a human MTA1 partial fragment by My G. Mahoney's research team. The full length Mta3 cDNA was cloned through 5'-RACE methodology using RNA from C57B1/6J mouse skin. The deduced amino acids and its comparison with sequences in NCBI GenBank established MTA3 as the third MTA family member.

== Gene and spliced variants ==
The Mta3 is localized on chromosome 12p in mice and MTA3 on 2p21 in human. The human MTA3 gene contains 20 exons, and 19 alternative spliced transcripts. Of these, nine MTA3 transcripts are predicted to code six proteins of 392, 514, 515, 537, 590 and 594 amino acids long, two MTA3 transcripts code 18 amino acids and 91 amino acids polypeptides. The remaining 10 transcripts are non-coding RNAs. The murine Mta3 gene contains nine transcripts, six of which are predicted to code proteins ranging from 251 amino acids to 591 amino acids while one transcript codes for 40 amino acids polypeptide. The murine Mta3 gene contains two predicted non-coding RNAs.

== Structure ==
The overall organization of MTA3 protein domains is similar to the other two family members with a BAH (Bromo-Adjacent Homology), an ELM2 domain (egl-27 and MTA1 homology), a SANT (SWI, ADA2, N-CoR, TFIIIB-B), a GATA-like zinc finger, and one predicted bipartite nuclear localization signal (NLS). The SH3 motif of Mta3 allows it to interact with Fyn and Grb2 – both SH3 containing signaling proteins.

== Function ==
Functions of MTA3 are believed to be differentially regulated in the context of cancer-types. For example, MTA3 expression is downregulated in breast cancer and endometrioid adenocarcinomas. MTA3 is overexpressed in non-small cell lung cancer and human placenta and chorionic carcinoma cells. In breast cancer, loss of MTA3 promotes EMT and invasiveness of breast cancer cells via upregulating Snail, which in turn represses E-cadherin adhesion molecule. In the mammary epithelium and breast cancer cells, MTA3 is an estrogen regulated gene and part of a larger regulatory network involving MTA1 and MTAs, all modifiers of hormone response, and participate in the processes involved in growth and differentiation. Accordingly, the MTA3-NuRD complex regulates the expression of Wnt4 in mammary epithelial cells and mice, and controls Wnt4-dependent ductal morphogenesis.

In contrast to its repressive actions, MTA3 also stimulates the expression of HIF1α as well as its target genes under hypoxic conditions in trophoblasts and is thought to be involved in differentiation during pregnancy. MTA3-NuRD complex and downstream targets have been shown to participate in primitive hematopoietic and angiogenesis in a zebrafish model system As a part of BCL6 corepressor complex, MTA3 regulates BCL6-dependent repression of target genes, including PRDM1, and modulates the differentiation of B-cells.

== Regulation ==
The estrogen receptor-stimulates the expression of MTA3 in breast cancer cells. The SP1 transcription factor stimulates the transcription of MTA3. MicroRNA-495 inhibits the level of MTA3 mRNA as well as the growth and migration of non-small cell lung cancer cells. The β-elemene - a traditional Chinese medicine, upregulates MTA3's expression in breast cancer cells

== Targets ==
The MTA3-NuRD complex represses Snail, a master regulator of epithelial-to-mesenchymal transition (EMT), Wnt4 expression in mammary epithelial cells, and BCL6-corepressor target genes The MTA3-NuRD complex interacts with GATA3 to regulate the expression of GATA3 downstream targets. In addition, MTA3 upregulates HIF1 and its transactivation activity in hypoxic conditions.
