= IFRD1 =

Protein-coding gene in the species Homo sapiens

Identifiers
- Aliases: IFRD1, PC4, TIS7, interferon related developmental regulator 1
- External IDs: OMIM: 603502; MGI: 1316717; GeneCards: IFRD1

Gene location (Human)
Chr.	Chromosome 7 (human)
Band	7q31.1	Start	112,422,887 bp
Band	7q31.1	End	112,481,017 bp

Gene location (Mouse)
Chr.	Chromosome 12 (mouse)
Band	12 B1|12 18.06 cM	Start	40,251,566 bp
Band	12 B1|12 18.06 cM	End	40,298,503 bp
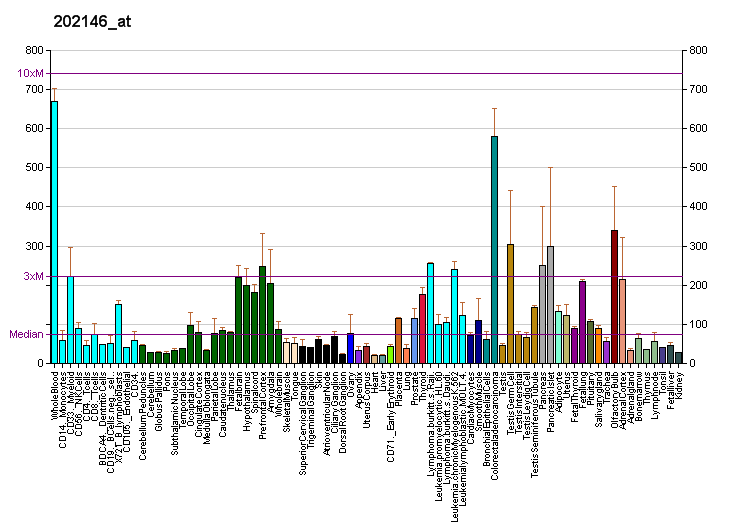
RNA expression pattern
Bgee	Human / Mouse (ortholog); Top expressed in: body of pancreas; jejunal mucosa; Skeletal muscle tissue of rectus abdominis; Epithelium of choroid plexus; germinal epithelium; vena cava; amniotic fluid; gastric mucosa; saphenous vein; right lung / Top expressed in: secondary oocyte; granulocyte; zygote; parotid gland; muscle of thigh; lip; ventricular zone; superior cervical ganglion; intercostal muscle; cumulus cell; More reference expression data
BioGPS	More reference expression data
Orthologs
Databases	NCBI: entry; OMA: entry
Species	Human	Mouse
Entrez	3475	15982
Ensembl	ENSG00000006652	ENSMUSG00000001627
UniProt	O00458	P19182
RefSeq (mRNA)	NM_001007245; NM_001197079; NM_001197080; NM_001550	NM_013562
RefSeq (protein)	NP_001007246; NP_001184008; NP_001184009; NP_001541	NP_038590
Location (UCSC)	Chr 7: 112.42 – 112.48 Mb	Chr 12: 40.25 – 40.3 Mb
PubMed search
- Wikidata
View/Edit Human	View/Edit Mouse

Interferon-related developmental regulator 1 is a protein that in humans is encoded by the IFRD1 gene. The gene is expressed mostly in neutrophils, skeletal and cardiac muscle, the brain, and the pancreas. The rat and the mouse homolog genes of interferon-related developmental regulator 1 gene (and their proteins) are also known with the name PC4 and Tis21, respectively. IFRD1 is member of a gene family that comprises a second gene, IFRD2, also known as SKmc15.

== Clinical significance ==
IFRD1 has been identified as a modifier gene for cystic fibrosis lung disease. In humans, neutrophil effector function is dependent on the type of IRFD1 polymorphism present in the individual. Human and mouse data both indicate that IFRD1 has a sizable impact on cystic fibrosis pathogenesis by regulating neutrophil effector function.

== Inducer of muscle regeneration ==
IFRD1(also known as PC4 or Tis7, see above) participates to the process of skeletal muscle cell differentiation. In fact, inhibition of IFRD1 function in C2C12 myoblasts, by antisense IFRD1 cDNA transfection or microinjection of anti-IFRD1 antibodies, prevents their morphological and biochemical differentiation by inhibiting the expression of MyoD and myogenin, key master genes of muscle development. A role for IFRD1 in muscle differentiation has been observed also in vivo. Muscles from mice lacking IFRD1 display decreased protein and mRNA levels of MyoD, and myogenin, and after muscle crash damage in young mice there was a delay in regeneration.

Recently it has been shown that upregulation of IFRD1 in vivo in injured muscle potentiates muscle regeneration by increasing the production of staminal muscle cells (satellite cells). The underlying molecular mechanism lies in the ability of IFRD1 to cooperate with MyoD at inducing the transcriptional activity of MEF2C. This relies on the ability of IFRD1 to bind selectively MEF2C, thus inhibiting its interaction with HDAC4. Therefore, IFRD1 appears to act as a positive cofactor of MyoD. More recently it has been shown that IFRD1 potentiates muscle regeneration by a second mechanism that potentiates MyoD, i.e., by repressing the transcriptional activity of NF-κB, which is known to inhibit MyoD mRNA accumulation. IFRD1 represses the activity of NF-κB p65 by enhancing the HDAC-mediated deacetylation of the p65 subunit, by favoring the recruitment of HDAC3 to p65. In fact, IFRD1 forms trimolecular complexes with p65 and HDAC3.

Thus, IFRD1 can induce muscle regeneration acting as a pivotal regulator of the MyoD pathway through multiple mechanisms. Given the dramatic decrease of myogenic cells occurring in muscle degenerative pathologies such as Duchenne dystrophy, the ability of IFRD1 to potentiate the regenerative process suggests that IFRD1 might be a therapeutic target.

== Interactions ==
IFRD1 has been shown to interact with several proteins in the SIN3 complex including SIN3B, SAP30, NCOR1, and HDAC1. Moreover, IFRD1 protein binds MyoD, MEF2C, HDAC4, HDAC3 and the p65 subunit of NF-κB, forming trimolecular complexes with HDAC3 and p65 NF-κB proteins. IFRD1 protein also forms homodimers.
