= MTA2 =

Protein-coding gene in the species Homo sapiens

Identifiers
- Aliases: MTA2, MTA1L1, PID, metastasis associated 1 family member 2
- External IDs: OMIM: 603947; MGI: 1346340; GeneCards: MTA2

Gene location (Human)
Chr.	Chromosome 11 (human)
Band	11q12.3	Start	62,593,214 bp
Band	11q12.3	End	62,601,865 bp

Gene location (Mouse)
Chr.	Chromosome 19 (mouse)
Band	19|19 A	Start	8,919,239 bp
Band	19|19 A	End	8,929,667 bp
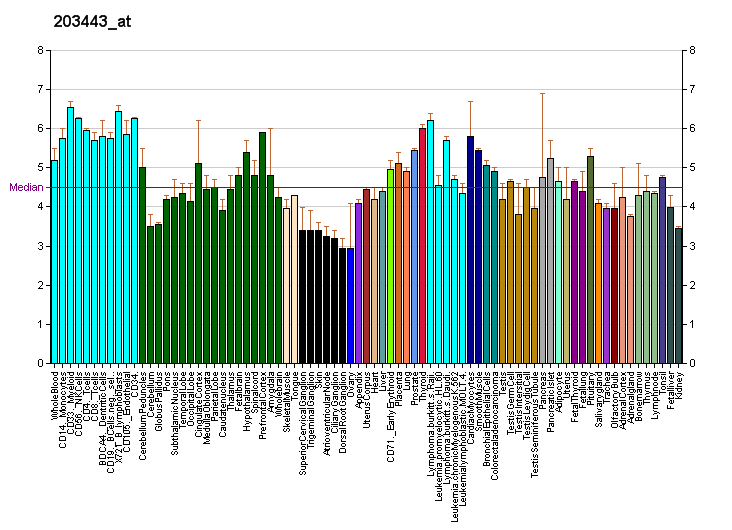

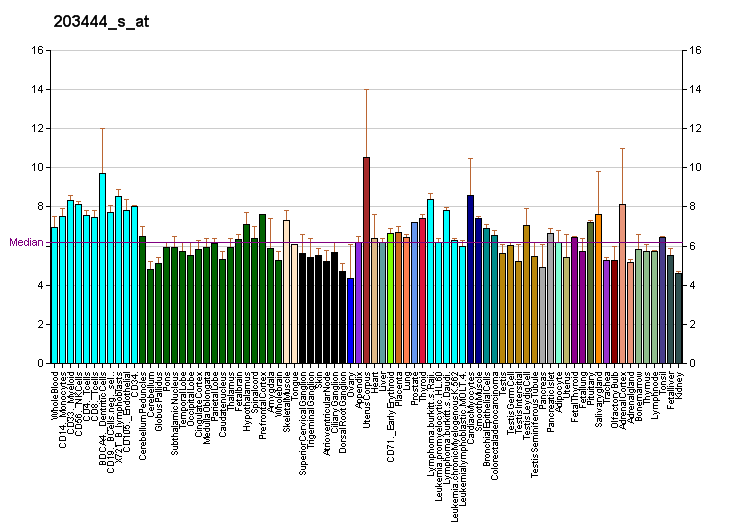
RNA expression pattern
Bgee	Human / Mouse (ortholog); Top expressed in: granulocyte; ganglionic eminence; skin of abdomen; skin of leg; left uterine tube; rectum; smooth muscle tissue; ventricular zone; right ovary; tibial nerve / Top expressed in: neural layer of retina; ventricular zone; thymus; genital tubercle; tail of embryo; lip; granulocyte; epiblast; mesenteric lymph nodes; tibiofemoral joint; More reference expression data
BioGPS	More reference expression data
Gene ontology
Molecular function	DNA binding; sequence-specific DNA binding; DNA-binding transcription factor activity; zinc ion binding; histone deacetylase binding; chromatin binding; metal ion binding; protein binding; nucleosomal DNA binding; histone deacetylase activity; transcription cis-regulatory region binding; DNA-binding transcription factor activity, RNA polymerase II-specific; transcription coregulator activity; transcription coactivator activity; transcription corepressor activity
Cellular component	histone deacetylase complex; NuRD complex; membrane; transcription regulator complex; nucleoplasm; nucleus; protein-containing complex
Biological process	regulation of transcription, DNA-templated; negative regulation of transcription by RNA polymerase II; DNA methylation; regulation of fibroblast migration; negative regulation of transcription, DNA-templated; histone deacetylation; positive regulation of transcription by RNA polymerase II; regulation of signal transduction by p53 class mediator
Sources:Amigo / QuickGO
Orthologs
Databases	NCBI: entry; OMA: entry
Species	Human	Mouse
Entrez	9219	23942
Ensembl	ENSG00000149480	ENSMUSG00000071646
UniProt	O94776	Q9R190
RefSeq (mRNA)	NM_004739; NM_001330292	NM_011842
RefSeq (protein)	NP_001317221; NP_004730	NP_035972
Location (UCSC)	Chr 11: 62.59 – 62.6 Mb	Chr 19: 8.92 – 8.93 Mb
PubMed search
- Wikidata
View/Edit Human	View/Edit Mouse

Metastasis-associated protein MTA2 is a protein that in humans is encoded by the MTA2 gene.

MTA2 is the second member of the MTA family of genes. MTA2 protein localizes in the nucleus and is a component of the nucleosome remodeling and the deacetylation complex (NuRD). Similar to the founding family member MTA1, MTA2 functions as a chromatin remodeling factor and regulates gene expression. MTA2 is overexpressed in human cancer and its dysregulated level correlates well with cancer invasiveness and aggressive phenotypes.

== Discovery ==
MTA2 was initially recognized as an MTA1 like 1 gene, named MTA1-L1, from a large scale sequencing of randomly selected clones from human cDNA libraries in 1999. Clues about the role of MTA2 in gene expression came from the association of MTA2 polypeptides in the NuRD complex in a proteomic study This was followed by targeted cloning of murine Mta2 in 2001.

== Gene and spliced variants ==
MTA2 is localized on chromosome 11q12-q13.1 in human and on 19B in mice. The 8.6-kb long human MTA2 gene contains 20 exons and seven transcripts inclusive of three protein-coding transcripts but predicted to code for two polypeptides of 688 amino acids and 495 amino acids. The remaining four MTA2 transcripts are non-coding RNA transcripts ranging from 532-bp to 627-bp. The murine Mta2 consists of a 3.1-kb protein-coding transcript to code a protein of 668 amino acids, and five non-coding RNAs transcripts, ranging from 620-bp to 839-bp.

== Structure ==
Amino acid sequence of MTA2 shares 68.2% homology with MTA1's sequence. MTA2 domains include, a BAH (Bromo-Adjacent Homology), an ELM2 domain (egl-27 and MTA1 homology), a SANT domain (SWI, ADA2, N-CoR, TFIIIB-B), and a GATA-like zinc finger. MTA2 is acetylated at lysine 152 within the BAH domain

== Function ==
This gene encodes a protein that has been identified as a component of NuRD, a nucleosome remodeling deacetylase complex identified in the nucleus of human cells. It shows a very broad expression pattern and is strongly expressed in many tissues. It may represent one member of a small gene family that encode different but related proteins involved either directly or indirectly in transcriptional regulation. Their indirect effects on transcriptional regulation may include chromatin remodeling.

MTA2 inhibits estrogen receptor-transactivation functions, and participates in the development of hormones independent of breast cancer cells. The MTA2 participate in the circadian rhythm through CLOCK-BMAL1 complex. MTA2 inhibits the expression of target genes owing to its ability to interact with chromatin remodeling complexes, and modulates pathways involved in cellular functions, including invasion, apoptosis, epithelial-to-mesenchymal transition, and growth of normal and cancer cells

== Regulation ==
Expression of MTA2 is stimulated by Sp1 transcription factor and repressed by Kaiso. Growth regulatory activity of MTA2 is modulated through its acetylation by histone acetylase p300 [12]. The expression of MTA2 is inhibited by the Rho GDIa in breast cancer cells and by human β-defensins in colon cancer cells. MicroRNAs-146a and miR-34a also regulate the levels of MTA2 mRNA through post-transcriptional mechanism.

== Targets ==
MTA2 deacetylates the estrogen receptor alpha and p53 and inhibits their transactivation functions. MTA2 represses the expression of E-cadherin in non-small-cell lung cancer cells. but stimulates the expression of IL-11 in gastric cancer cells. The MTA2-containing chromatin remodeling complex targets CLOCK-BMAL1 complex.

== Interactions ==
MTA2 has been shown to interact with:

- CHD4,
- HDAC1,
- HDAC2,
- MBD3
- MTA1,
- RBBP4,
- RBBP7, and
- SATB1.
