= Extended ELM2 domain =

Extended EGL-27 and MTA1 homology domain

Identifiers
- Symbol: EELM2
- Pfam: PF15863
Available protein structures:
- PDB: PF15863 (ECOD; PDBsum)
- AlphaFold: PF15863

The extended EGL-27 and MTA1 homology domain, or EELM2 domain, is a protein domain that occurs in proteins from apicomplexan parasites.

Part of the EELM2 domain is homologous to the ELM2 domain, but is 'extended' in that its boundaries (the region of conservation) are longer than in the ELM2 domain. Currently (as of 2012), little is known about the function of this domain. However, some proteins that contain an EELM2 domain also contain a PHD finger domain, which is thought to be involved in chromatin remodelling. This suggests an associated role for the EELM2 domain. This suggestion is supported by the fact that proteins with EELM2 domains were detected in the P. falciparum nucleus.

== See also ==
- ELM2 domain
