= MIER1 =

Protein-coding gene in humans

Identifiers
- Aliases: MIER1, ER1, MI-ER1, MIER1 transcriptional regulator
- External IDs: OMIM: 616848; MGI: 1918398; GeneCards: MIER1

Gene location (Human)
Chr.	Chromosome 1 (human)
Band	1p31.3	Start	66,924,895 bp
Band	1p31.3	End	66,988,619 bp

Gene location (Mouse)
Chr.	Chromosome 4 (mouse)
Band	4|4 C6	Start	102,971,587 bp
Band	4|4 C6	End	103,022,951 bp
RNA expression pattern
Bgee	Human / Mouse (ortholog); Top expressed in: Achilles tendon; epithelium of colon; mucosa of ileum; sural nerve; bone marrow; bone marrow cell; mucosa of colon; mucosa of sigmoid colon; skin of arm; tail of epididymis / Top expressed in: hand; superior cervical ganglion; thymus; Gonadal ridge; tail of embryo; genital tubercle; interventricular septum; mesenteric lymph nodes; left colon; blood; More reference expression data
BioGPS	n/a
Gene ontology
Molecular function	DNA binding; protein binding; signal transducer activity; histone deacetylase activity; histone deacetylase binding
Cellular component	cytoplasm; transcription repressor complex; nucleoplasm; nucleus
Biological process	positive regulation of I-kappaB kinase/NF-kappaB signaling; regulation of transcription, DNA-templated; transcription, DNA-templated; signal transduction; histone deacetylation
Sources:Amigo / QuickGO
Orthologs
Databases	NCBI: entry; OMA: entry
Species	Human	Mouse
Entrez	57708	71148
Ensembl	ENSG00000198160	ENSMUSG00000028522
UniProt	Q8N108	Q5UAK0
RefSeq (mRNA)	NM_001077700; NM_001077701; NM_001077702; NM_001077703; NM_001077704 NM_001146110; NM_001146111; NM_001146112; NM_001146113; NM_001278215; NM_020948; NM_001350530	NM_001039081; NM_001286221; NM_001286222; NM_001286223; NM_027696
RefSeq (protein)	NP_001071168; NP_001071169; NP_001071170; NP_001071171; NP_001071172 NP_001139582; NP_001139583; NP_001139584; NP_001139585; NP_001265144; NP_065999; NP_001337459	NP_001034170; NP_001273150; NP_001273151; NP_001273152; NP_081972 NP_001391009; NP_001391010; NP_001391011; NP_001391013; NP_001391014
Location (UCSC)	Chr 1: 66.92 – 66.99 Mb	Chr 4: 102.97 – 103.02 Mb
PubMed search
- Wikidata
View/Edit Human	View/Edit Mouse

Mesoderm induction early response protein 1 is a protein that in humans is encoded by the MIER1 gene.

== Interactions ==
MIER1 has been shown to interact with HDAC1.
