= CHD4 =

Protein-coding gene in humans

Identifiers
- Aliases: CHD4, CHD-4, Mi-2b, Mi2-BETA, chromodomain helicase DNA binding protein 4, SIHIWES
- External IDs: OMIM: 603277; MGI: 1344380; GeneCards: CHD4
Available structures
PDB	Ortholog search: PDBe RCSB
PDB	List of PDB id codes 1MM2, 1MM3, 2EE1, 2L5U, 2L75, 4O9I, 2N5N

Gene location (Human)
Chr.	Chromosome 12 (human)
Band	12p13.31	Start	6,570,082 bp
Band	12p13.31	End	6,614,524 bp

Gene location (Mouse)
Chr.	Chromosome 6 (mouse)
Band	6 F2|6 59.28 cM	Start	125,072,944 bp
Band	6 F2|6 59.28 cM	End	125,107,554 bp
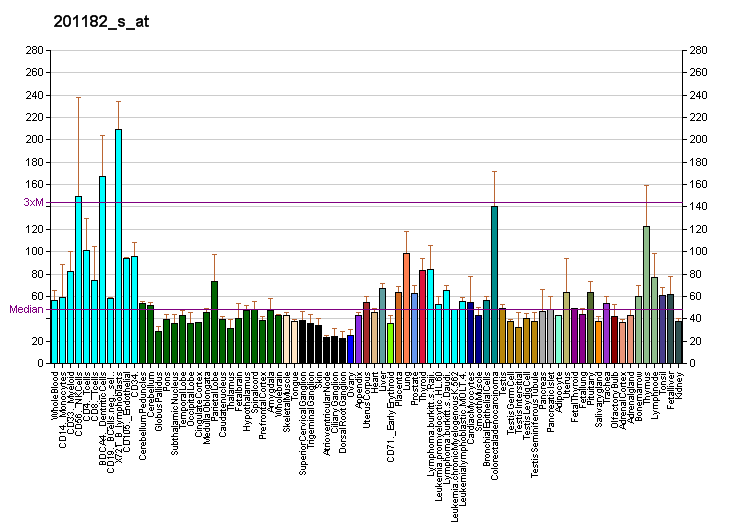

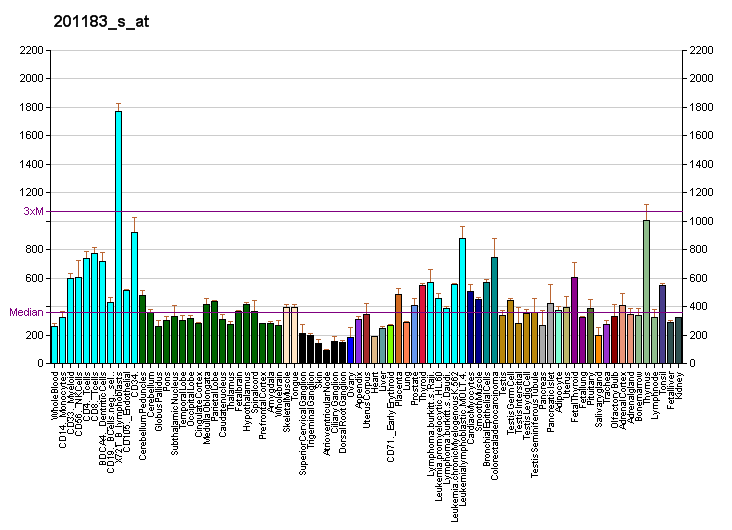

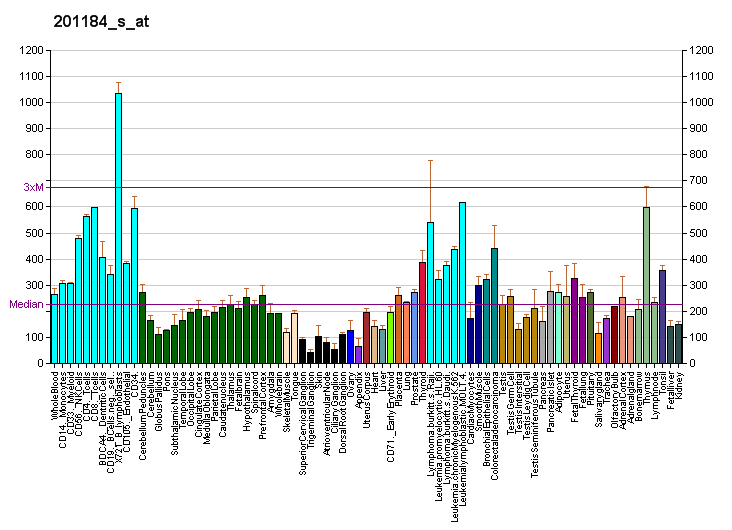
RNA expression pattern
Bgee	Human / Mouse (ortholog); Top expressed in: ventricular zone; ganglionic eminence; epithelium of colon; right lobe of thyroid gland; anterior pituitary; sural nerve; apex of heart; right adrenal cortex; left lobe of thyroid gland; right coronary artery / Top expressed in: Ileal epithelium; Rostral migratory stream; choroid plexus of fourth ventricle; tail of embryo; genital tubercle; entorhinal cortex; perirhinal cortex; neural layer of retina; ventricular zone; yolk sac; More reference expression data
BioGPS	More reference expression data
Gene ontology
Molecular function	RNA polymerase II cis-regulatory region sequence-specific DNA binding; DNA binding; nucleotide binding; helicase activity; DNA helicase activity; transcription factor binding; metal ion binding; protein binding; nucleosomal DNA binding; hydrolase activity; ATP binding; histone deacetylase activity; histone deacetylase binding; zinc ion binding
Cellular component	cytoplasm; NuRD complex; centrosome; membrane; nucleoplasm; microtubule organizing center; protein-DNA complex; cytoskeleton; nucleus; protein-containing complex
Biological process	regulation of transcription, DNA-templated; regulation of transcription by RNA polymerase II; negative regulation of transcription by RNA polymerase II; transcription, DNA-templated; terminal button organization; histone deacetylation; DNA duplex unwinding; regulation of signal transduction by p53 class mediator; chromatin organization
Sources:Amigo / QuickGO
Orthologs
Databases	NCBI: entry; OMA: entry
Species	Human	Mouse
Entrez	1108	107932
Ensembl	ENSG00000111642	ENSMUSG00000063870
UniProt	Q14839	Q6PDQ2
RefSeq (mRNA)	NM_001273; NM_001297553; NM_001363606	NM_145979; NM_001346610
RefSeq (protein)	NP_001264; NP_001284482; NP_001350535	NP_001333539; NP_666091; NP_001390521; NP_001390522; NP_001390523 NP_001390524; NP_001390525; NP_001390526; NP_001390527
Location (UCSC)	Chr 12: 6.57 – 6.61 Mb	Chr 6: 125.07 – 125.11 Mb
PubMed search
- Wikidata
View/Edit Human	View/Edit Mouse

Chromodomain-helicase-DNA-binding protein 4 is an enzyme that in humans is encoded by the CHD4 gene. CHD4 is the core nucleosome-remodelling component of the Nucleosome Remodelling and Deacetylase (NuRD) complex.

== Function ==
The product of this gene belongs to the SNF2/RAD54 helicase family. It represents the main component of the nucleosome remodeling and deacetylase complex and plays an important role in epigenetic transcriptional repression. Patients with dermatomyositis develop antibodies against this protein.

== Interactions ==
CHD4 has been shown to interact with HDAC1, Histone deacetylase 2, MTA2, SATB1 and Ataxia telangiectasia and Rad3 related.

== Clinical ==
Mutations in this gene have been associated with a condition known as Sifrim-Hitz-Weiss syndrome. This condition is characterized by

- Brain anomalies
- Macrocephaly
- Deafness
- Ophthalmic abnormalities
- Dysmorphic features
- Congenital heart defects
- Hypogonadism in males
- Skeletal and limb anomalies
- Global developmental delay
- Mild to moderate intellectual disability
