= RBBP4 =

Protein-coding gene in humans

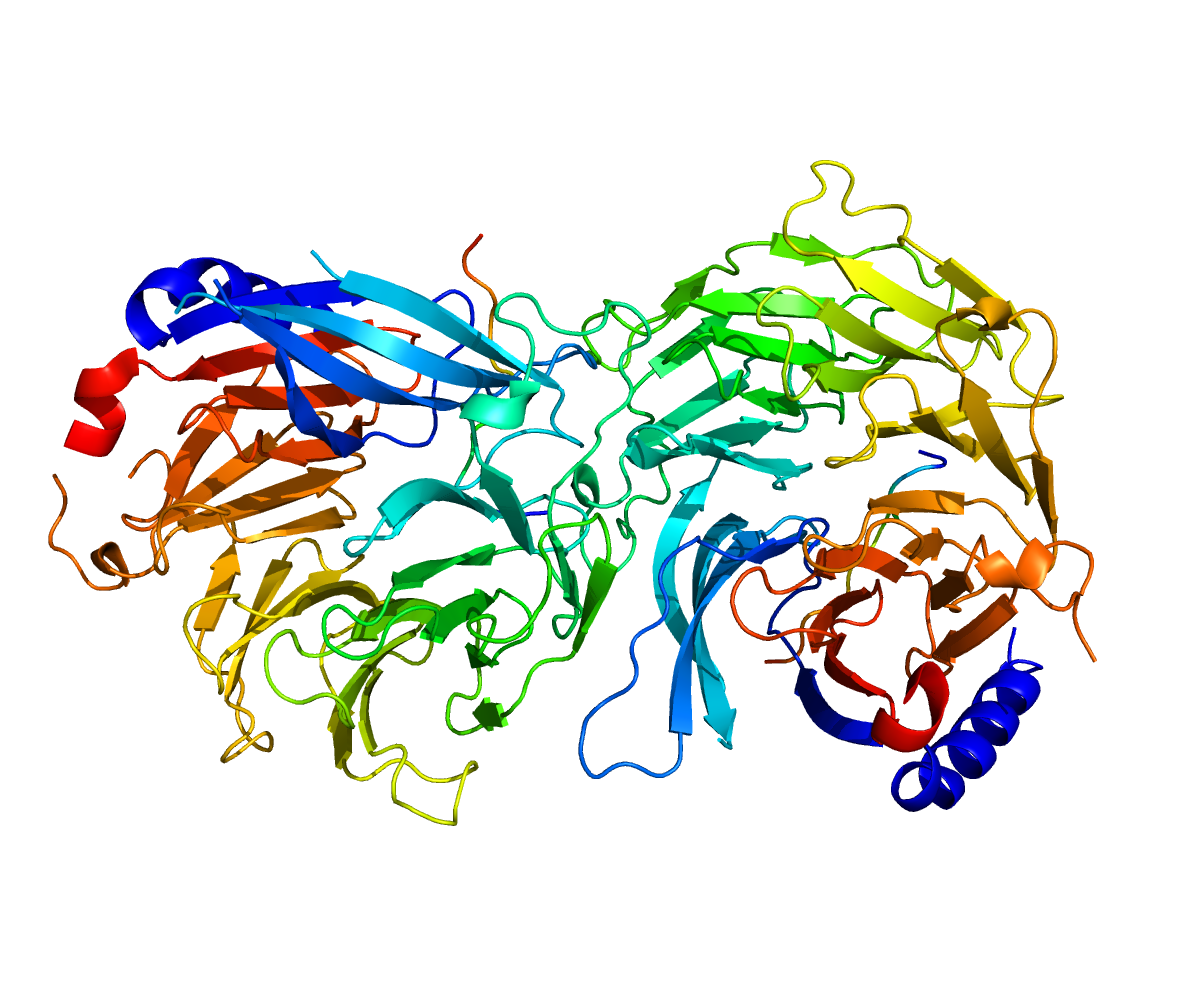

Identifiers
- Aliases: RBBP4, NURF55, RBAP48, lin-53, retinoblastoma binding protein 4, RB binding protein 4, chromatin remodeling factor
- External IDs: OMIM: 602923; MGI: 1194912; GeneCards: RBBP4
Available structures
PDB	Ortholog search: PDBe RCSB
PDB	List of PDB id codes 2XU7, 3GFC, 4PBY, 4PBZ, 4PC0, 4R7A, 5FXY

Gene location (Human)
Chr.	Chromosome 1 (human)
Band	1p35.1	Start	32,651,142 bp
Band	1p35.1	End	32,686,211 bp

Gene location (Mouse)
Chr.	Chromosome 4 (mouse)
Band	4|4 D2.2	Start	129,200,893 bp
Band	4|4 D2.2	End	129,229,163 bp
RNA expression pattern
Bgee	Human / Mouse (ortholog); Top expressed in: ganglionic eminence; ventricular zone; bone marrow cell; right testis; left testis; monocyte; epithelium of colon; appendix; islet of Langerhans; stromal cell of endometrium / Top expressed in: Paneth cell; medial ganglionic eminence; condyle; vestibular membrane of cochlear duct; fossa; vas deferens; primitive streak; renal corpuscle; abdominal wall; fetal liver hematopoietic progenitor cell; More reference expression data
BioGPS	n/a
Gene ontology
Molecular function	RNA polymerase II cis-regulatory region sequence-specific DNA binding; ATP-dependent activity, acting on DNA; histone binding; histone deacetylase binding; protein binding; nucleosomal DNA binding; histone deacetylase activity
Cellular component	NuRD complex; ESC/E(Z) complex; CAF-1 complex; Sin3 complex; nucleoplasm; NURF complex; nucleus; cytosol; protein-containing complex
Biological process	chromatin remodeling; regulation of transcription, DNA-templated; CENP-A containing chromatin assembly; transcription, DNA-templated; regulation of cell cycle; DNA replication-dependent chromatin assembly; DNA replication; negative regulation of gene expression, epigenetic; cell cycle; negative regulation of cell population proliferation; regulation of signal transduction by p53 class mediator; histone deacetylation; response to growth hormone; negative regulation of G0 to G1 transition; chromatin organization
Sources:Amigo / QuickGO
Orthologs
Databases	NCBI: entry; OMA: entry
Species	Human	Mouse
Entrez	5928	19646
Ensembl	ENSG00000162521	ENSMUSG00000057236
UniProt	Q09028	Q60972
RefSeq (mRNA)	NM_005610; NM_001135255; NM_001135256	NM_009030
RefSeq (protein)	NP_001128727; NP_001128728; NP_005601	NP_033056
Location (UCSC)	Chr 1: 32.65 – 32.69 Mb	Chr 4: 129.2 – 129.23 Mb
PubMed search
- Wikidata
View/Edit Human	View/Edit Mouse

Histone-binding protein RBBP4 (also known as RbAp48, or NURF55) is a protein that in humans is encoded by the RBBP4 gene.

== Function ==
This gene encodes a ubiquitously expressed nuclear protein that belongs to a highly conserved subfamily of WD-repeat proteins. It is present in protein complexes involved in histone acetylation and chromatin assembly. It is part of the Mi-2/NuRD complex that has been implicated in chromatin remodeling and transcriptional repression associated with histone deacetylation. This encoded protein is also part of corepressor complexes, which is an integral component of transcriptional silencing. It is found among several cellular proteins that bind directly to retinoblastoma protein to regulate cell proliferation. This protein also seems to be involved in transcriptional repression of E2F-responsive genes.

== Clinical significance ==
A decrease of RbAp48 in the dentate gyrus (DG) of the hippocampus in the brain is suspected to be a main cause of memory loss in normal aging. An age related decrease in RbAp48 is observed in the DG from human post-mortem tissue and also in mice. Furthermore, a gene knockin of a dominant negative form of RbAp48 causes memory deficits in young mice similar to that observed in older mice. Using lentiviral gene transfer to increase the expression of RbAp48 in the brain reverses memory deficits in older mice.

RBBP4 works at least in part through the PKA-CREB1-CPB pathway. Hence one possible therapeutic approach to restore age-related memory loss is the use of PKA-CREB1-CPB pathway stimulating drugs. It has previously been shown that dopamine D1/D5 agonists such as 6-Br-APB and SKF-38,393 that are positively coupled to adenylyl cyclase and the cAMP phosphodieserase inhibitor rolipram reduce memory defects in aged mice.

== Interactions ==
RBBP4 has been shown to interact with:

- BRCA1,
- CREBBP,
- GATAD2B,
- HDAC1,
- HDAC2,
- HDAC3,
- MTA2,
- RB,
- SAP30, and
- SIN3A.
