= CHD3 =

Protein-coding gene in humans

Identifiers
- Aliases: CHD3, Mi-2a, Mi2-ALPHA, ZFH, chromodomain helicase DNA binding protein 3, SNIBCPS
- External IDs: OMIM: 602120; MGI: 1344395; GeneCards: CHD3

Gene location (Human)
Chr.	Chromosome 17 (human)
Band	17p13.1	Start	7,884,796 bp
Band	17p13.1	End	7,912,760 bp

Gene location (Mouse)
Chr.	Chromosome 11 (mouse)
Band	11|11 B3	Start	69,234,099 bp
Band	11|11 B3	End	69,260,232 bp
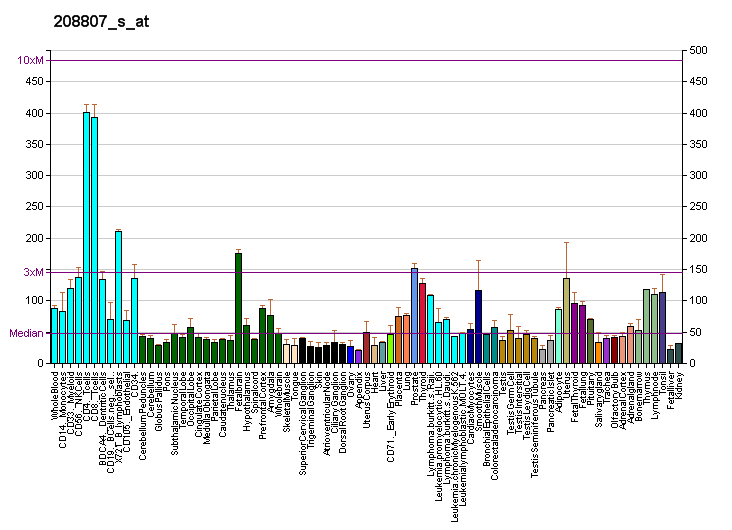

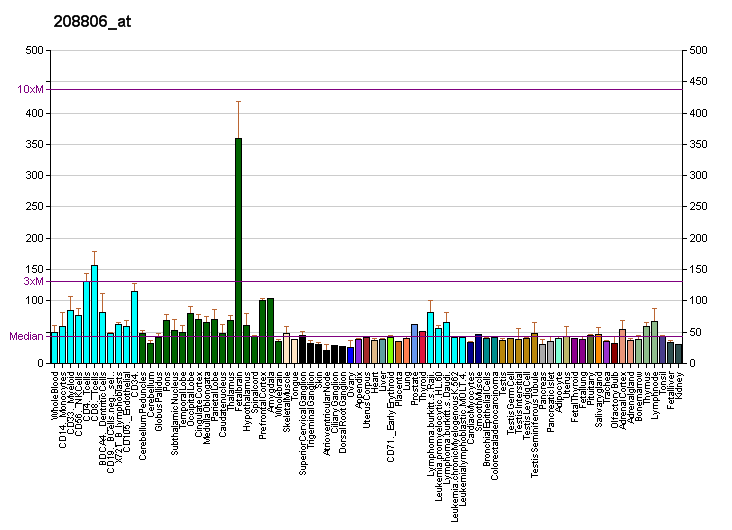
RNA expression pattern
Bgee	Human / Mouse (ortholog); Top expressed in: ganglionic eminence; right uterine tube; granulocyte; canal of the cervix; body of uterus; sural nerve; gastric mucosa; left uterine tube; anterior pituitary; right ovary / Top expressed in: dentate gyrus of hippocampal formation granule cell; hand; external carotid artery; internal carotid artery; primary visual cortex; subiculum; Rostral migratory stream; superior frontal gyrus; ventricular zone; anterior amygdaloid area; More reference expression data
BioGPS	More reference expression data
Gene ontology
Molecular function	metal ion binding; nucleotide binding; DNA helicase activity; helicase activity; hydrolase activity; ATP binding; protein binding; DNA binding; histone deacetylase activity; RNA binding; zinc ion binding; ATPase activity; double-stranded DNA helicase activity
Cellular component	nucleolus; nucleoplasm; cytoplasm; nucleus; NuRD complex; centrosome; cytoskeleton; microtubule organizing center
Biological process	transcription, DNA-templated; spindle organization; regulation of transcription by RNA polymerase II; regulation of transcription, DNA-templated; chromatin organization; histone deacetylation; DNA duplex unwinding; regulation of signal transduction by p53 class mediator; centrosome cycle
Sources:Amigo / QuickGO
Orthologs
Databases	NCBI: entry; OMA: entry
Species	Human	Mouse
Entrez	1107	216848
Ensembl	ENSG00000170004	ENSMUSG00000018474
UniProt	Q12873	n/a
RefSeq (mRNA)	NM_001005271; NM_001005273; NM_005852; NM_001272	NM_146019
RefSeq (protein)	NP_001005271; NP_001005273; NP_005843	n/a
Location (UCSC)	Chr 17: 7.88 – 7.91 Mb	Chr 11: 69.23 – 69.26 Mb
PubMed search
- Wikidata
View/Edit Human	View/Edit Mouse

Chromodomain-helicase-DNA-binding protein 3 is an enzyme that in humans is encoded by the CHD3 gene.

== Function ==
This gene encodes a member of the CHD family of proteins which are characterized by the presence of chromo (chromatin organization modifier) domains and SNF2-related helicase/ATPase domains. This protein is one of the components of a histone deacetylase complex referred to as the Mi-2/NuRD complex which participates in the remodeling of chromatin by deacetylating histones. Chromatin remodeling is essential for many processes including transcription. Autoantibodies against this protein are found in a subset of patients with dermatomyositis. Three alternatively spliced transcripts encoding different isoforms have been described.

Mutations in CHD3 cause a neurodevelopmental syndrome (Snijders Blok-Campeau syndrome) with macrocephaly and impaired speech and language.

== Interactions ==
CHD3 has been shown to interact with:

- HDAC1,
- Histone deacetylase 2 and
- SERBP1.
