= SIN3A =

Protein-coding gene in the species Homo sapiens

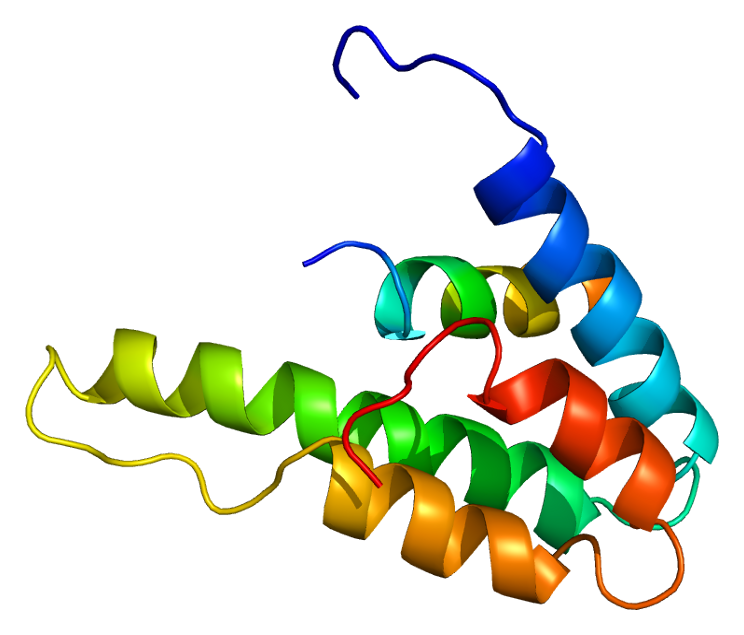

Identifiers
- Aliases: SIN3A, Paired amphipathic helix protein Sin3a, SIN3 transcription regulator family member A, WITKOS
- External IDs: OMIM: 607776; MGI: 107157; GeneCards: SIN3A
Available structures
PDB	Ortholog search: PDBe RCSB
PDB	List of PDB id codes 1PO4

Gene location (Human)
Chr.	Chromosome 15 (human)
Band	15q24.2	Start	75,369,379 bp
Band	15q24.2	End	75,455,842 bp

Gene location (Mouse)
Chr.	Chromosome 9 (mouse)
Band	9 B|9 30.89 cM	Start	56,979,324 bp
Band	9 B|9 30.89 cM	End	57,035,650 bp
RNA expression pattern
Bgee	Human / Mouse (ortholog); Top expressed in: secondary oocyte; ventricular zone; pancreatic ductal cell; bone marrow cell; testicle; ganglionic eminence; Achilles tendon; mucosa of ileum; tibial arteries; skin of limb / Top expressed in: zygote; secondary oocyte; tail of embryo; primary oocyte; genital tubercle; ectoderm; otic placode; otic vesicle; saccule; epiblast; More reference expression data
BioGPS	n/a
Gene ontology
Molecular function	DNA binding; transcription corepressor activity; histone deacetylase activity; DNA-binding transcription factor activity; protein deacetylase activity; transcription factor binding; chromatin binding; transcription cis-regulatory region binding; protein binding; RNA binding; protein-containing complex binding
Cellular component	transcription regulator complex; transcription repressor complex; nucleoplasm; nucleolus; chromatin; nucleus; kinetochore; Sin3 complex; protein-containing complex
Biological process	negative regulation of protein localization to nucleus; regulation of transcription, DNA-templated; regulation of transcription from RNA polymerase II promoter in response to oxidative stress; rhythmic process; cellular response to dopamine; response to methylglyoxal; negative regulation of circadian rhythm; regulation of hormone levels; ageing; negative regulation of apoptotic process; in utero embryonic development; negative regulation of transcription by RNA polymerase II; transcription, DNA-templated; protein deacetylation; DNA replication; negative regulation of transcription regulatory region DNA binding; response to organonitrogen compound; hematopoietic progenitor cell differentiation; activation of innate immune response; positive regulation of G2/M transition of mitotic cell cycle; negative regulation of transcription, DNA-templated; histone deacetylation; negative regulation of histone H3-K27 acetylation; cellular response to glucose stimulus; positive regulation of transcription by RNA polymerase II; positive regulation of defense response to virus by host; regulation of lipid metabolic process; regulation of megakaryocyte differentiation; negative regulation of nucleic acid-templated transcription
Sources:Amigo / QuickGO
Orthologs
Databases	NCBI: entry; OMA: entry
Species	Human	Mouse
Entrez	25942	20466
Ensembl	ENSG00000169375	ENSMUSG00000042557
UniProt	Q96ST3	Q60520
RefSeq (mRNA)	NM_001145357; NM_001145358; NM_015477	NM_001110350; NM_001110351; NM_011378; NM_001357754
RefSeq (protein)	NP_001138829; NP_001138830; NP_056292	NP_001103820; NP_001103821; NP_035508; NP_001344683
Location (UCSC)	Chr 15: 75.37 – 75.46 Mb	Chr 9: 56.98 – 57.04 Mb
PubMed search
- Wikidata
View/Edit Human	View/Edit Mouse

Paired amphipathic helix protein Sin3a is a protein that in humans is encoded by the SIN3A gene.

== Function ==
The protein encoded by this gene is a transcriptional regulatory protein. It contains paired amphipathic helix (PAH) domains, which are important for protein-protein interactions and may mediate repression by the Mad-Max complex.

== Interactions ==
SIN3A has been shown to interact with:

- CABIN1
- HBP1,
- HDAC1,
- HDAC9,
- Histone deacetylase 2,
- Host cell factor C1,
- IKZF1,
- ING1,
- KLF11,
- MNT,
- MXD1,
- Methyl-CpG-binding domain protein 2,
- Nuclear receptor co-repressor 2,
- OGT,
- PHF12,
- Promyelocytic leukemia protein,
- RBBP4,
- RBBP7,
- SAP130,
- SAP30,
- SMARCA2,
- SMARCA4,
- SMARCC1,
- SUDS3,
- TAL1, and
- Zinc finger and BTB domain-containing protein 16.

== See also ==
- Transcription coregulator
