= SAP30 =

Protein-coding gene in the species Homo sapiens

Identifiers
- Aliases: SAP30, Sin3A associated protein 30
- External IDs: OMIM: 603378; MGI: 1929129; GeneCards: SAP30
Available structures
PDB	Ortholog search: PDBe RCSB
PDB	List of PDB id codes 2KDP

Gene location (Human)
Chr.	Chromosome 4 (human)
Band	4q34.1	Start	173,369,969 bp
Band	4q34.1	End	173,377,532 bp

Gene location (Mouse)
Chr.	Chromosome 8 (mouse)
Band	8 B2|8 29.85 cM	Start	57,935,741 bp
Band	8 B2|8 29.85 cM	End	57,940,894 bp
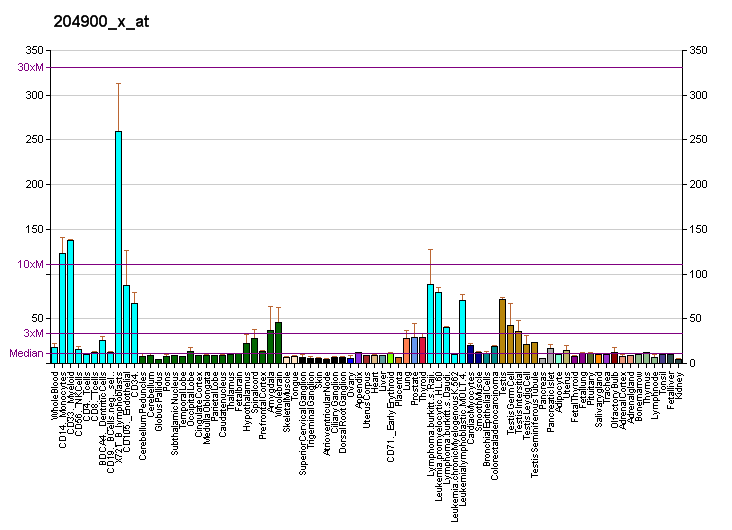

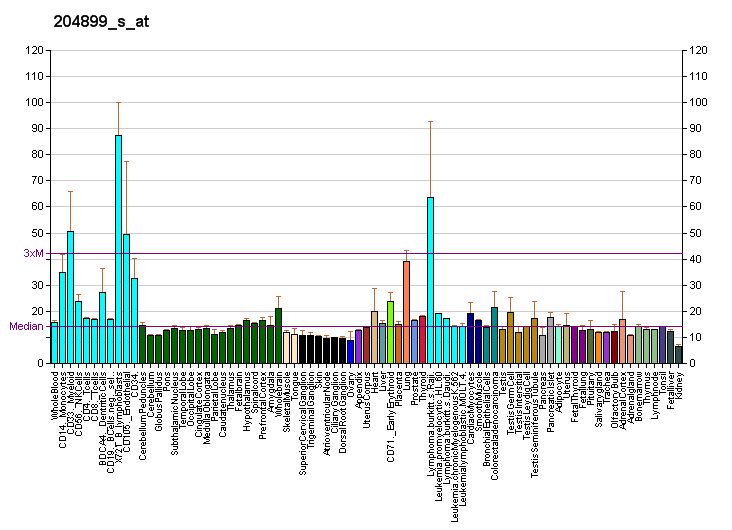
RNA expression pattern
Bgee	Human / Mouse (ortholog); Top expressed in: secondary oocyte; ventricular zone; ganglionic eminence; tibial arteries; Achilles tendon; monocyte; tendon of biceps brachii; Descending thoracic aorta; ascending aorta; internal globus pallidus / Top expressed in: zygote; secondary oocyte; medial ganglionic eminence; primary oocyte; endocardial cushion; genital tubercle; atrioventricular valve; abdominal wall; proximal tubule; mandibular prominence; More reference expression data
BioGPS	More reference expression data
Gene ontology
Molecular function	DNA binding; protein binding; transcription corepressor activity; metal ion binding; histone deacetylase activity
Cellular component	histone deacetylase complex; nucleus; nucleoplasm
Biological process	skeletal muscle cell differentiation; regulation of transcription, DNA-templated; negative regulation of transcription by RNA polymerase II; transcription, DNA-templated; histone deacetylation
Sources:Amigo / QuickGO
Orthologs
Databases	NCBI: entry; OMA: entry
Species	Human	Mouse
Entrez	8819	60406
Ensembl	ENSG00000164105	ENSMUSG00000031609
UniProt	O75446	O88574
RefSeq (mRNA)	NM_003864	NM_021788
RefSeq (protein)	NP_003855	NP_068560.1
Location (UCSC)	Chr 4: 173.37 – 173.38 Mb	Chr 8: 57.94 – 57.94 Mb
PubMed search
- Wikidata
View/Edit Human	View/Edit Mouse

Sin3A-associated protein, 30kDa, also known as SAP30, is a protein which in humans is encoded by the SAP30 gene.

== Function ==
Histone acetylation plays a key role in the regulation of eukaryotic gene expression. Histone acetylation and deacetylation are catalyzed by multisubunit complexes. The protein encoded by this gene is a component of the histone deacetylase complex, which includes SIN3A, SAP18, HDAC1, HDAC2, RbAp46, RbAp48, and other polypeptides. This complex is active in deacetylating core histone octamers, but inactive in deacetylating nucleosomal histones. A pseudogene of this gene is located on chromosome 3.

Mammals have one paralog of SAP30, named SAP30-like (SAP30L), which shares 70% sequence identity with SAP30. SAP30 and SAP30L together constitute a well-conserved SAP30 protein family. Also SAP30L interacts with several components of the Sin3A corepressor complex and induces transcriptional repression via recruitment of Sin3A and histone deacetylases.

Proteins of the SAP30 family (SAP30 proteins) have a functional nucleolar localization signal and they are able to target Sin3A to the nucleolus. SAP30 proteins have sequence-independent contact with DNA by their N-terminal zinc-dependent module and their acidic central region contributes to histone and nucleosome interactions. The DNA binding of SAP30 proteins is regulated by the nuclear signalling lipids, phosphoinositides (PI). SAP30 proteins provide the first example in which the DNA and PIs seem to stand in a mutually antagonizing interrelationship in regard to their interaction with zinc finger proteins and thus exemplifies the molecular mechanism how these lipids can contribute for gene regulation.

== Interactions ==
SAP30 has been shown to interact with:

- HDAC1,
- Histone deacetylase 2,
- ING1 and
- Nuclear receptor co-repressor 1,
- RBBP4,
- RBBP7,
- SIN3A, and
- YY1.
