= YY1 =

Transcriptional repressor protein

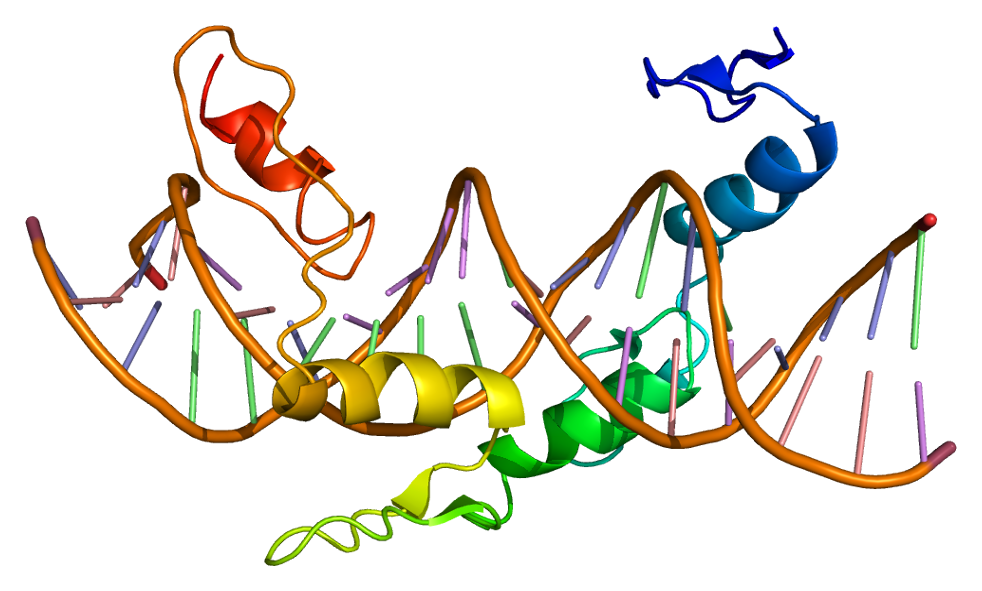

Identifiers
- Aliases: YY1, DELTA, INO80S, NF-E1, UCRBP, YIN-YANG-1, YY1 transcription factor, GADEVS
- External IDs: OMIM: 600013; MGI: 99150; GeneCards: YY1
Available structures
PDB	Ortholog search: PDBe RCSB
PDB	List of PDB id codes 1UBD, 1ZNM, 4C5I

Gene location (Human)
Chr.	Chromosome 14 (human)
Band	14q32.2	Start	100,238,298 bp
Band	14q32.2	End	100,282,788 bp

Gene location (Mouse)
Chr.	Chromosome 12 (mouse)
Band	12 F1|12 59.58 cM	Start	108,758,899 bp
Band	12 F1|12 59.58 cM	End	108,786,074 bp
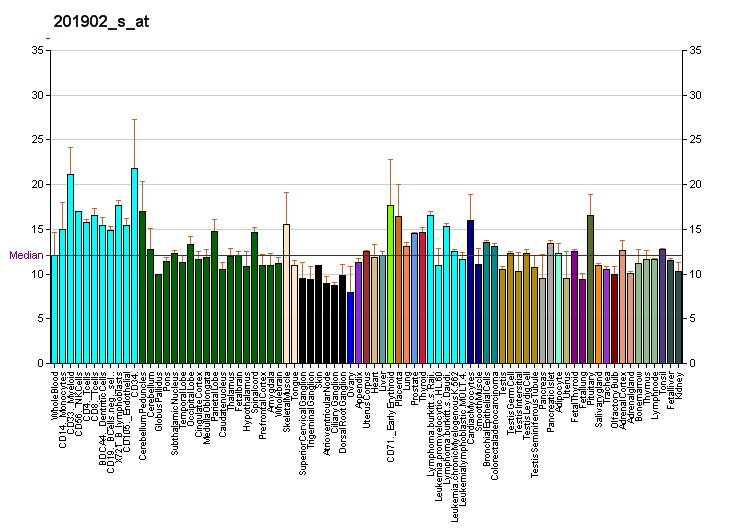

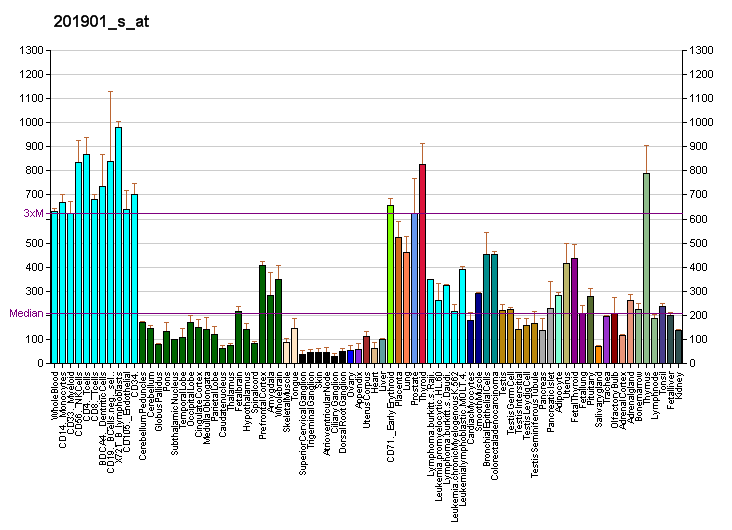
RNA expression pattern
Bgee	Human / Mouse (ortholog); Top expressed in: ventricular zone; ganglionic eminence; endothelial cell; middle temporal gyrus; Brodmann area 23; rectum; monocyte; tonsil; sural nerve; skin of thigh / Top expressed in: medullary collecting duct; primitive streak; ureter; renal corpuscle; Gonadal ridge; abdominal wall; left lung lobe; cumulus cell; human fetus; endocardial cushion; More reference expression data
BioGPS	More reference expression data
Gene ontology
Molecular function	DNA binding; transcription corepressor activity; transcription coactivator activity; zinc ion binding; metal ion binding; protein binding; four-way junction DNA binding; cis-regulatory region sequence-specific DNA binding; RNA binding; nucleic acid binding; SMAD binding; RNA polymerase II cis-regulatory region sequence-specific DNA binding; DNA-binding transcription repressor activity, RNA polymerase II-specific; DNA-binding transcription factor activity; sequence-specific DNA binding; DNA-binding transcription factor activity, RNA polymerase II-specific; histone deacetylase binding
Cellular component	Ino80 complex; nuclear matrix; nucleus; nucleoplasm; transcription regulator complex; cytoplasm; PcG protein complex
Biological process	cell differentiation; DNA recombination; regulation of transcription, DNA-templated; regulation of transcription by RNA polymerase II; cellular response to UV; negative regulation of gene expression; transcription, DNA-templated; cellular response to DNA damage stimulus; double-strand break repair via homologous recombination; spermatogenesis; DNA repair; protein deubiquitination; negative regulation of interferon-beta production; negative regulation of transcription by RNA polymerase II; RNA localization; anterior/posterior pattern specification; response to UV-C; positive regulation of gene expression; response to prostaglandin F; positive regulation of transcription by RNA polymerase II; camera-type eye morphogenesis; chromosome organization; cellular response to interleukin-1; negative regulation of pri-miRNA transcription by RNA polymerase II; negative regulation of cell growth involved in cardiac muscle cell development
Sources:Amigo / QuickGO
Orthologs
Databases	NCBI: entry; OMA: entry
Species	Human	Mouse
Entrez	7528	22632
Ensembl	ENSG00000100811	ENSMUSG00000021264
UniProt	P25490	Q00899
RefSeq (mRNA)	NM_003403	NM_009537
RefSeq (protein)	NP_003394	NP_033563
Location (UCSC)	Chr 14: 100.24 – 100.28 Mb	Chr 12: 108.76 – 108.79 Mb
PubMed search
- Wikidata
View/Edit Human	View/Edit Mouse

YY1 (Yin Yang 1) is a transcriptional repressor protein in humans that is encoded by the YY1 gene.

== Function ==
YY1 is a ubiquitously distributed transcription factor belonging to the GLI-Kruppel class of zinc finger proteins. The protein is involved in repressing and activating a diverse number of promoters. Hence, the YY in the name stands for "yin-yang." YY1 may direct histone deacetylases and histone acetyltransferases to a promoter in order to activate or repress the promoter, thus implicating histone modification in the function of YY1. YY1 promotes enhancer-promoter chromatin loops by forming dimers and promoting DNA interactions. Its dysregulation disrupts enhancer-promoter loops and gene expression.

== Clinical significance ==
YY1 heterozygous deletions, missense, and nonsense mutations cause Gabriele-DeVries syndrome (GADEVS), an autosomal dominant neurodevelopmental disorder characterized by intellectual disability, dysmorphic facial features, feeding problems, intrauterine growth restriction, variable cognitive impairment, behavioral problems and other congenital malformations. A website is available in order to collect and share clinical information between clinicians and the families of affected individuals.

== Interactions ==
YY1 has been shown to interact with:

- ATF6,
- EP300
- FKBP3
- HDAC3
- Histone deacetylase 2
- Myc
- NOTCH1
- RYBP and
- SAP30
- Serine—tRNA ligase
