= HDAC1 =

Protein-coding gene in humans

Identifiers
- Aliases: HDAC1, GON-10, HD1, RPD3, RPD3L1, histone deacetylase 1, KDAC1
- External IDs: OMIM: 601241; MGI: 108086; GeneCards: HDAC1
Available structures
PDB	Ortholog search: PDBe RCSB
PDB	List of PDB id codes 4BKX, 5ICN
Enzyme activity
EC #	BRENDA	ExPASy	KEGG	MetaCyc
3.5.1.98	↗	↗	↗	↗

Gene location (Human)
Chr.	Chromosome 1 (human)
Band	1p35.2-p35.1	Start	32,292,083 bp
Band	1p35.2-p35.1	End	32,333,635 bp

Gene location (Mouse)
Chr.	Chromosome 4 (mouse)
Band	4 D2.2|4 63.26 cM	Start	129,409,897 bp
Band	4 D2.2|4 63.26 cM	End	129,436,506 bp
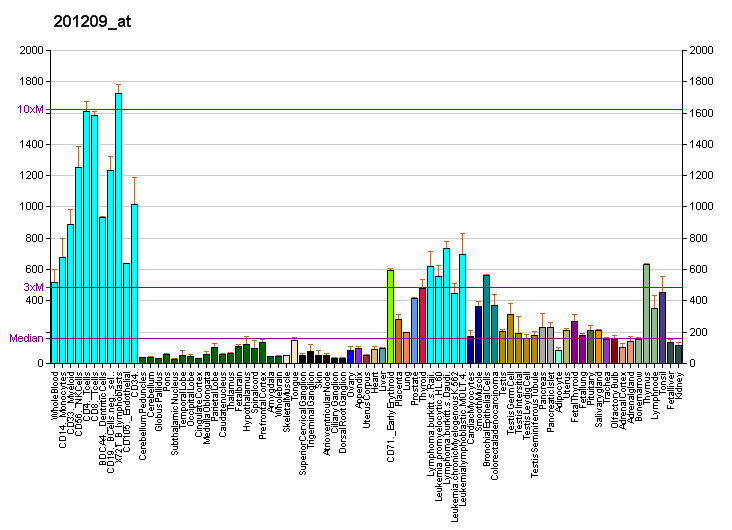
RNA expression pattern
Bgee	Human / Mouse (ortholog); Top expressed in: mucosa of colon; mucosa of sigmoid colon; mucosa of transverse colon; epithelium of nasopharynx; rectum; lymph node; pylorus; right uterine tube; cecum; gums / Top expressed in: tail of embryo; genital tubercle; morula; ventricular zone; bone marrow; yolk sac; thymus; embryo; blastocyst; placenta; More reference expression data
BioGPS	More reference expression data
Gene ontology
Molecular function	RNA polymerase II cis-regulatory region sequence-specific DNA binding; NAD-dependent histone deacetylase activity (H3-K14 specific); transcription corepressor activity; histone deacetylase activity; protein N-terminus binding; DNA-binding transcription factor activity; protein deacetylase activity; histone deacetylase binding; transcription cis-regulatory region binding; NF-kappaB binding; deacetylase activity; protein binding; nucleosomal DNA binding; enzyme binding; hydrolase activity; core promoter sequence-specific DNA binding; p53 binding; transcription factor binding; RNA polymerase II core promoter sequence-specific DNA binding; DNA binding; chromatin binding; Krueppel-associated box domain binding; E-box binding; promoter-specific chromatin binding
Cellular component	cytoplasm; NuRD complex; cytosol; histone deacetylase complex; Sin3 complex; nucleoplasm; nucleus; chromatin; heterochromatin; transcription regulator complex; transcription repressor complex; protein-containing complex; soma; Sin3-type complex
Biological process	hair follicle placode formation; epidermal cell differentiation; chromatin remodeling; regulation of transcription, DNA-templated; rhythmic process; negative regulation of androgen receptor signaling pathway; embryonic digit morphogenesis; negative regulation of apoptotic process; blood coagulation; negative regulation of transcription by RNA polymerase II; eyelid development in camera-type eye; circadian regulation of gene expression; negative regulation of gene expression; positive regulation of transcription, DNA-templated; odontogenesis of dentin-containing tooth; protein deacetylation; histone H4 deacetylation; fungiform papilla formation; negative regulation of myotube differentiation; viral process; histone deacetylation; negative regulation of canonical Wnt signaling pathway; positive regulation of transcription by RNA polymerase II; transcription, DNA-templated; regulation of signal transduction by p53 class mediator; DNA methylation-dependent heterochromatin assembly; beta-catenin-TCF complex assembly; chromatin organization; positive regulation of cell population proliferation; negative regulation of transcription, DNA-templated; histone H3 deacetylation; regulation of megakaryocyte differentiation; regulation of transcription by RNA polymerase II; endoderm development; circadian rhythm; hippocampus development; neuron differentiation; negative regulation of I-kappaB kinase/NF-kappaB signaling; positive regulation of oligodendrocyte differentiation; regulation of endopeptidase activity; regulation of amyloid-beta clearance; negative regulation of intrinsic apoptotic signaling pathway
Sources:Amigo / QuickGO
Orthologs
Databases	NCBI: entry; OMA: entry
Species	Human	Mouse
Entrez	3065	433759
Ensembl	ENSG00000116478	ENSMUSG00000028800
UniProt	Q13547	O09106
RefSeq (mRNA)	NM_004964	NM_008228
RefSeq (protein)	NP_004955	NP_032254
Location (UCSC)	Chr 1: 32.29 – 32.33 Mb	Chr 4: 129.41 – 129.44 Mb
PubMed search
- Wikidata
View/Edit Human	View/Edit Mouse

Histone deacetylase 1 (HDAC1) is an enzyme that in humans is encoded by the HDAC1 gene.

== Function ==
Histone acetylation and deacetylation, catalyzed by multisubunit complexes, play a key role in the regulation of eukaryotic gene expression. The protein encoded by this gene belongs to the histone deacetylase/acuc/apha family and is a component of the histone deacetylase complex. It also interacts with retinoblastoma tumor-suppressor protein and this complex is a key element in the control of cell proliferation and differentiation. Together with metastasis-associated protein-2 MTA2, it deacetylates p53 and modulates its effect on cell growth and apoptosis.

== Interactions ==
HDAC1 has been shown to interact with:

- Androgen receptor,
- BCL6,
- BTG2,
- BUB1B,
- BUB1,
- BUB3,
- CBFA2T3,
- CDC20,
- CDH1,
- CHD3,
- CHD4,
- COUP-TFII,
- CTBP1,
- DDX17,
- DDX5,
- DNMT3A,
- DNMT3L,
- Death-associated protein 6,
- EED,
- EVI1,
- EZH2,
- FKBP3,
- GATA1,
- HMG20B,
- HSPA4,
- HUS1,
- Histone deacetylase 2,
- Homeobox protein TGIF1,
- Host cell factor C1,
- IFRD1,
- IKZF1,
- ING1,
- MBD3,
- MIER1,
- MLL,
- MTA1,
- MTA2,
- Mad1,
- Mdm2,
- Methyl-CpG-binding domain protein 2,
- Mothers against decapentaplegic homolog 2,
- MyoD,
- NFKB1,
- Nuclear receptor co-repressor 2,
- P21,
- PCNA,
- PHF21A,
- Prohibitin,
- Promyelocytic leukemia protein,
- RAD9A,
- RBBP4,
- RBBP7,
- RCOR1,
- RELA,
- RFC1,
- Retinoblastoma protein,
- Retinoblastoma-like protein 1,
- Retinoblastoma-like protein 2,
- SAP30,
- SATB1,
- SIN3A,
- SIN3B,
- SPEN,
- SUDS3,
- SUV39H1,
- Sp1 transcription factor,
- TOP2A,
- TOP2B, and
- Zinc finger and BTB domain-containing protein 16.

== See also ==
- Histone deacetylase
- Histone deacetylase inhibitor
