= Histone deacetylase 2 =

Protein-coding gene in the species Homo sapiens

HDAC2

Identifiers
- Aliases: HDAC2, HD2, RPD3, YAF1, histone deacetylase 2, KDAC2
- External IDs: OMIM: 605164; MGI: 1097691; GeneCards: HDAC2
Available structures
PDB	Ortholog search: PDBe RCSB
PDB	List of PDB id codes 3MAX, 4LXZ, 4LY1
Enzyme activity
EC #	BRENDA	ExPASy	KEGG	MetaCyc
3.5.1.98	↗	↗	↗	↗

Gene location (Human)
Chr.	Chromosome 6 (human)
Band	6q21	Start	113,933,028 bp
Band	6q21	End	114,011,308 bp

Gene location (Mouse)
Chr.	Chromosome 10 (mouse)
Band	10 19.44 cM|10 B1	Start	36,850,540 bp
Band	10 19.44 cM|10 B1	End	36,877,885 bp
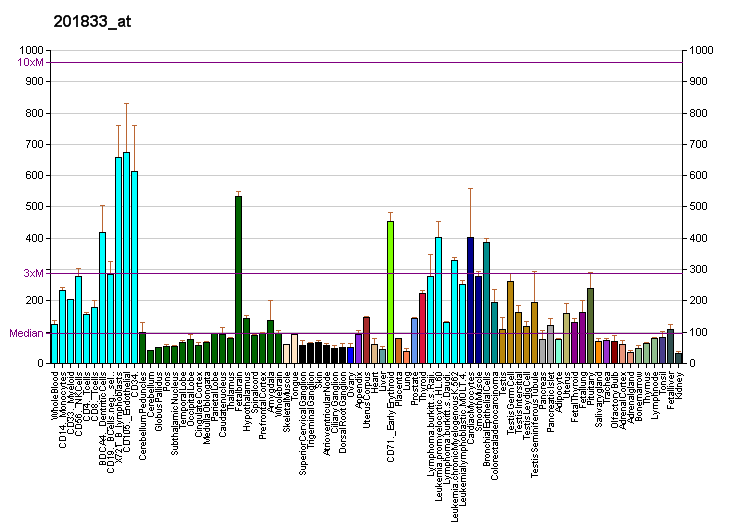
RNA expression pattern
Bgee	Human / Mouse (ortholog); Top expressed in: ganglionic eminence; ventricular zone; gonad; stromal cell of endometrium; right testis; islet of Langerhans; testicle; left testis; rectum; right ovary / Top expressed in: genital tubercle; ganglionic eminence; maxillary prominence; medial ganglionic eminence; abdominal wall; mandibular prominence; vas deferens; ventricular zone; limb bud; hand; More reference expression data
BioGPS	More reference expression data
Gene ontology
Molecular function	nucleosomal DNA binding; heat shock protein binding; transcription factor binding; RNA polymerase II cis-regulatory region sequence-specific DNA binding; enzyme binding; NAD-dependent histone deacetylase activity (H3-K14 specific); protein deacetylase activity; chromatin binding; NF-kappaB binding; protein binding; sequence-specific DNA binding; hydrolase activity; histone deacetylase activity; RNA binding; histone deacetylase binding; deacetylase activity; promoter-specific chromatin binding
Cellular component	cytoplasm; nucleus; NuRD complex; ESC/E(Z) complex; Sin3 complex; chromatin; nucleoplasm; histone deacetylase complex; protein-containing complex; Sin3-type complex; membrane; integral component of membrane
Biological process	cellular response to retinoic acid; cellular response to heat; rhythmic process; response to amphetamine; negative regulation of DNA binding; cardiac muscle hypertrophy; odontogenesis of dentin-containing tooth; positive regulation of proteolysis; positive regulation of interleukin-1 production; response to cocaine; cellular response to transforming growth factor beta stimulus; positive regulation of collagen biosynthetic process; histone H3 deacetylation; chromatin remodeling; negative regulation of peptidyl-lysine acetylation; regulation of transcription, DNA-templated; response to nicotine; embryonic digit morphogenesis; negative regulation of MHC class II biosynthetic process; negative regulation of DNA-binding transcription factor activity; transcription, DNA-templated; positive regulation of transcription, DNA-templated; histone H4 deacetylation; fungiform papilla formation; positive regulation of tumor necrosis factor production; response to caffeine; negative regulation of dendritic spine development; hair follicle placode formation; epidermal cell differentiation; positive regulation of oligodendrocyte differentiation; negative regulation of neuron projection development; response to hyperoxia; dendrite development; negative regulation of apoptotic process; negative regulation of transcription by RNA polymerase II; eyelid development in camera-type eye; positive regulation of epithelial to mesenchymal transition; circadian regulation of gene expression; response to lipopolysaccharide; behavioral response to ethanol; negative regulation of transcription, DNA-templated; cellular response to dopamine; blood coagulation; positive regulation of cell population proliferation; histone deacetylation; positive regulation of transcription by RNA polymerase II; cellular response to hydrogen peroxide; regulation of signal transduction by p53 class mediator; positive regulation of tyrosine phosphorylation of STAT protein; chromatin organization; positive regulation of male mating behavior
Sources:Amigo / QuickGO
Orthologs
Databases	NCBI: entry; OMA: entry
Species	Human	Mouse
Entrez	3066	15182
Ensembl	ENSG00000196591	ENSMUSG00000019777
UniProt	Q92769	P70288
RefSeq (mRNA)	NM_001527	NM_008229
RefSeq (protein)	NP_001518	NP_032255
Location (UCSC)	Chr 6: 113.93 – 114.01 Mb	Chr 10: 36.85 – 36.88 Mb
PubMed search
- Wikidata
View/Edit Human	View/Edit Mouse

Histone deacetylase 2 (HDAC2) is an enzyme that in humans is encoded by the HDAC2 gene. It belongs to the histone deacetylase class of enzymes responsible for the removal of acetyl groups from lysine residues at the N-terminal region of the core histones (H2A, H2B, H3, and H4). As such, it plays an important role in gene expression by facilitating the formation of transcription repressor complexes and for this reason is often considered an important target for cancer therapy.

Though the functional role of the class to which HDAC2 belongs has been carefully studied, the mechanism by which HDAC2 interacts with histone deacetylases of other classes has yet to be elucidated. HDAC2 is broadly regulated by protein kinase 2 (CK2) and protein phosphatase 1 (PP1), but biochemical analysis suggests its regulation is more complex (evinced by the coexistence of HDAC1 and HDAC2 in three distinct protein complexes). Essentially, the mechanism by which HDAC2 is regulated is still unclear by virtue of its various interactions, though a mechanism involving p300/CBP-associated factor and HDAC5 has been proposed in the context of cardiac reprogramming.

Generally, HDAC2 is considered a putative target for the treatment for a variety of diseases, due to its involvement in cell cycle progression. Specifically, HDAC2 has been shown to play a role in cardiac hypertrophy, Alzheimer's disease, Parkinson's disease, acute myeloid leukemia (AML), osteosarcoma, and stomach cancer.

== Structure and mechanism ==
This image shows the structure of the HDAC2 enzyme. The two consecutive benzene rings form the foot pocket, where as the single benzene rings forms the lipophilic tube.

HDAC2 belongs to the first class of histone deacetylases. The active site of HDAC2 contains a Zn^{2+} ion coordinated to the carbonyl group of a lysine substrate and a water molecule. The metallic ion facilitates the nucleophilic attack of the carbonyl group by a coordinated water molecule, leading to the formation of a tetrahedral intermediate. This intermediate is momentarily stabilized by hydrogen bond interactions and metal coordination, until it ultimately collapses resulting in the deacetylation of the lysine residue.

The HDAC2 active site consists of a lipophilic tube which leads from the surface to the catalytic center, and a 'foot pocket' containing mostly water molecules. The active site is connected to Gly154, Phe155, His183, Phe210, and Leu276. The footpocket is connected to Tyr29, Met35, Phe114, and Leu144.

== Function ==
This gene product belongs to the histone deacetylase family. Histone deacetylases act via the formation of large multiprotein complexes and are responsible for the deacetylation of lysine residues on the N-terminal region of the core histones (H2A, H2B, H3 and H4). This protein also forms transcriptional repressor complexes by associating with many different proteins, including YY1, a mammalian zinc-finger transcription factor. Thus, it plays an important role in transcriptional regulation, cell cycle progression and developmental events.

== Disease relevance ==
=== Cardiac hypertrophy ===
HDAC2 has been shown to play a role in the regulatory pathway of cardiac hypertrophy. Deficiencies in HDAC2 were shown to mitigate cardiac hypertrophy in hearts exposed to hypertrophic stimuli. However, in HDAC2 transgenic mice with inactivated glycogen synthase kinase 3beta (Gsk3beta), hypertrophy was observed at a higher frequency. In mice with activated Gsk3beta enzymes and HDAC2 deficiencies, sensitivity to hypertrophic stimulus was observed at a higher rate. The results suggest regulatory roles of HDAC2 and GSk3beta.

The HDAC2 enzyme attacking a lysine residue.

Mechanisms by which HDAC2 responds to hypertrophic stress have been proposed, though no general consensus has been met. One suggested mechanism puts forth casein kinase dependent phosphorylation of HDAC2, while a more recent mechanism suggests acetylation regulated by p300/CBP-associated factor and HDAC5.

=== Alzheimer's disease ===
It has been found that patients with Alzheimer's disease experience a decrease in the expression of neuronal genes. Furthermore, a recent study found that inhibition of HDAC2 via c-Abl by tyrosine phosphorylation prevented cognitive and behavioral impairments in mice with Alzheimer's disease. The results of the study support the role of c-Abl and HDAC2 in the signaling pathway of gene expression in patients with Alzheimer's disease. Currently, efforts to synthesize an HDAC2 inhibitor for the treatment of Alzheimer's disease are based on a pharmacophore with four features: one hydrogen bond acceptor, one hydrogen bond donor, and two aromatic rings.

=== Parkinson's disease ===
HDAC inhibitors have been regarded as a potential treatment of neurodegenerative diseases, such as Parkinson's disease. Parkinson's disease is usually accompanied by an increase in the number of microglial proteins in the substantia nigra of the brain. In vivo evidence has shown a correlation between the number of microglial proteins and the upregulation of HDAC2. It is thought therefore that HDAC2 inhibitors could be effective in treating microglial-initiated loss of dopaminergic neurons in the brain.

=== Cancer therapy ===
The role of HDAC2 in various forms of cancer such as osteosarcoma, gastric cancer, and acute myeloid leukemia have been studied. A recent study discovered decreased metastasis formation in mouse models that develop pancreatic cancer when the murine ortholog Hdac2 was genetically depleted. Current research is focused on creating inhibitors that decrease the upregulation of HDAC2.

=== Anti-influenza virus factor ===
HDAC2 plays a role in regulating the Signal Transducer and Activator of Transcription I (STAT1) and interferon-stimulated gene such as viperin. This shows that HDAC2 might be a component of cellular innate antiviral response. To circumvent the anti-viral potential, influenza A virus dysregulates HDAC2 by inducing its degradation by proteasomal degradation.

== Interactions ==
Histone deacetylase 2 has been shown to interact with:

- Ataxia telangiectasia and Rad3 related,
- BUB3,
- CDC20,
- CDH1,
- CHD3,
- CHD4,
- DNMT1,
- EED,
- EZH2 and
- FKBP3,
- GATA4,
- GTF2I,
- HDAC10,
- HDAC1,
- HMG20B,
- HSPA4,
- Host cell factor C1,
- MTA1,
- MTA2,
- MXD1,
- Mad1,
- Methyl-CpG-binding domain protein 2,
- PHF21A,
- PPP1R8,
- RBBP4,
- RCOR1,
- RELA,
- Retinoblastoma protein,
- SAP30,
- SIN3A,
- SMARCA5,
- SNW1,
- SUV39H1,
- Sp1 transcription factor,
- Sp3 transcription factor,
- TOP2B, and
- YY1.

== See also ==
- Histone deacetylase
