= RBBP7 =

Protein-coding gene in the species Homo sapiens

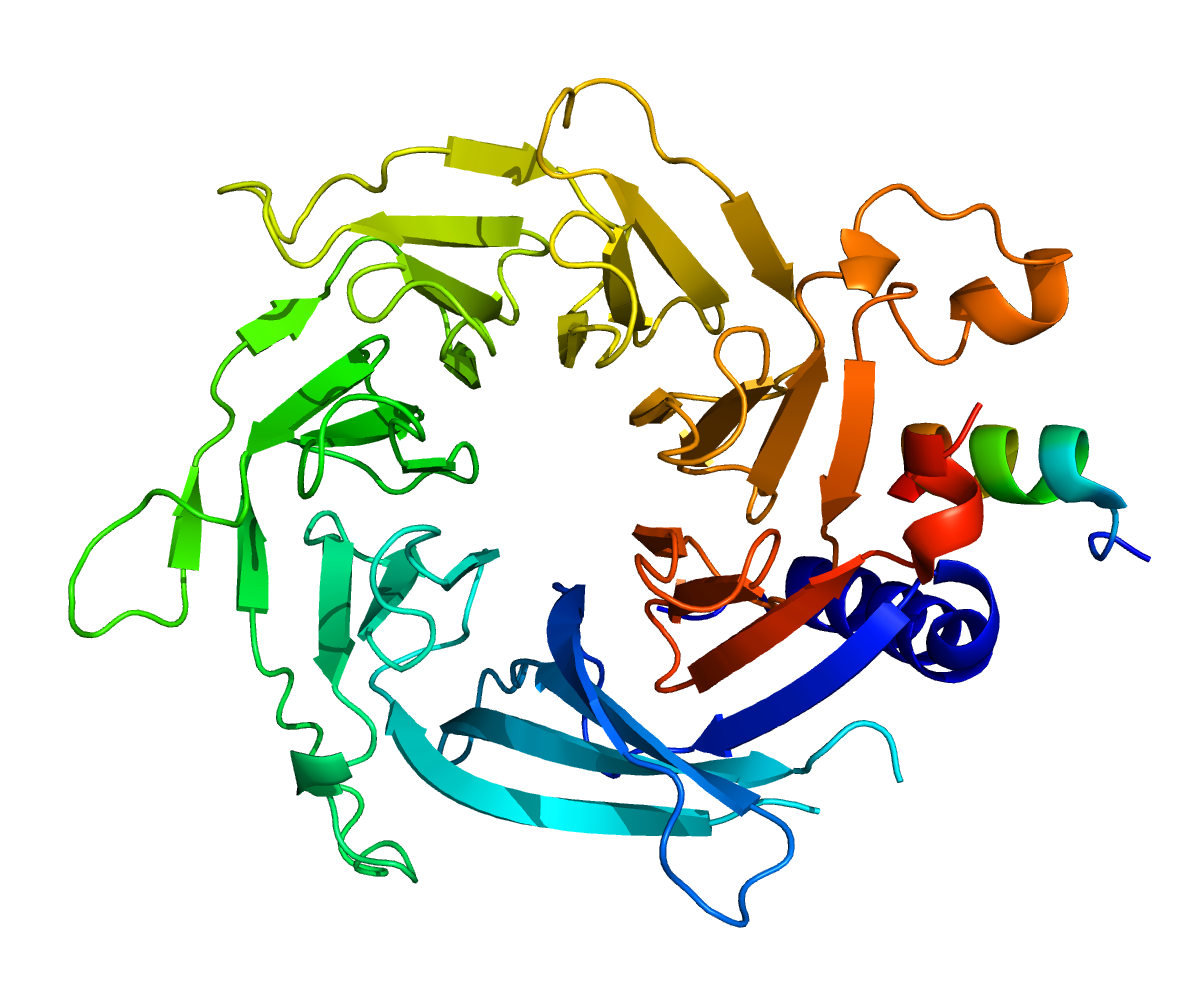

Identifiers
- Aliases: RBBP7, RbAp46, retinoblastoma binding protein 7, RB binding protein 7, chromatin remodeling factor
- External IDs: OMIM: 300825; MGI: 1194910; GeneCards: RBBP7
Available structures
| PDB | Ortholog search: PDBe RCSB |
| PDB | List of PDB id codes 3CFS, 3CFV |

Gene location (Human)
| Chr. | X chromosome (human) |
| Band | Xp22.2 | Start | 16,839,283 bp |
| Band | Xp22.2 | End | 16,870,362 bp |

Gene location (Mouse)
| Chr. | X chromosome (mouse) |
| Band | X|X F4 | Start | 161,543,398 bp |
| Band | X|X F4 | End | 161,562,088 bp |
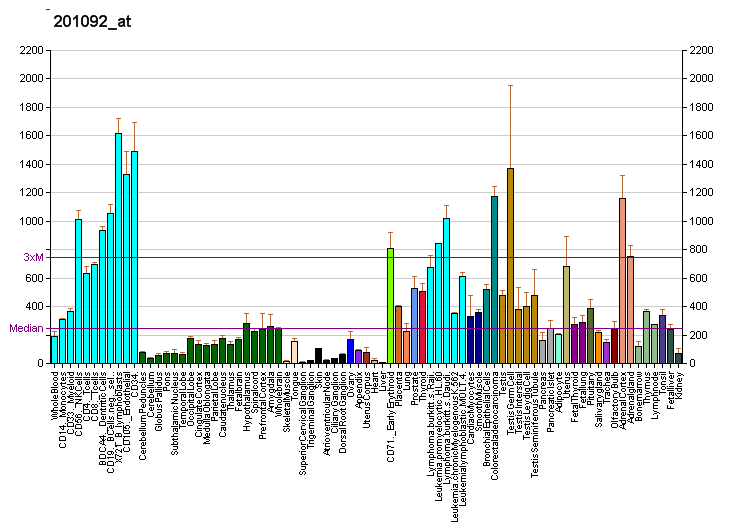
RNA expression pattern
| Bgee | Human / Mouse (ortholog); Top expressed in: oocyte; secondary oocyte; right adrenal gland; right adrenal cortex; left adrenal cortex; corpus epididymis; seminal vesicula; endothelial cell; right testis; left ovary / Top expressed in: primitive streak; migratory enteric neural crest cell; medullary collecting duct; condyle; ureter; Paneth cell; internal carotid artery; fossa; external carotid artery; vas deferens; More reference expression data |
| BioGPS | More reference expression data |
Gene ontology
| Molecular function | protein binding; RNA binding; histone deacetylase activity |
| Cellular component | NuRD complex; ESC/E(Z) complex; nucleus; nucleoplasm; cytosol |
| Biological process | regulation of transcription, DNA-templated; response to steroid hormone; cellular heat acclimation; negative regulation of transcription by RNA polymerase II; CENP-A containing chromatin assembly; transcription, DNA-templated; multicellular organism development; DNA replication; negative regulation of gene expression, epigenetic; negative regulation of cell growth; cell population proliferation; negative regulation of transcription, DNA-templated; regulation of signal transduction by p53 class mediator; histone deacetylation; post-translational protein modification; negative regulation of G0 to G1 transition; chromatin organization |
Sources:Amigo / QuickGO
Orthologs
| Databases | NCBI: entry; OMA: entry |
| Species | Human | Mouse |
| Entrez | 5931 | 245688 |
| Ensembl | ENSG00000102054 | ENSMUSG00000031353 |
| UniProt | Q16576 | Q60973 |
| RefSeq (mRNA) | NM_001198719; NM_002893 | NM_009031 |
| RefSeq (protein) | NP_001185648; NP_002884 | NP_033057 |
| Location (UCSC) | Chr X: 16.84 – 16.87 Mb | Chr X: 161.54 – 161.56 Mb |
| PubMed search |
- Wikidata
| View/Edit Human | View/Edit Mouse |

Histone-binding protein RBBP7 is a protein that in humans is encoded by the RBBP7 gene.

== Function ==
This protein is a ubiquitously expressed nuclear protein and belongs to a highly conserved subfamily of WD-repeat proteins. It is found among several proteins that binds directly to retinoblastoma protein, which regulates cell proliferation. The encoded protein is found in many histone deacetylase complexes, including mSin3 co-repressor complex. It is also present in protein complexes involved in chromatin assembly. This protein can interact with BRCA1 tumor-suppressor gene and may have a role in the regulation of cell proliferation and differentiation.

== Interactions ==
RBBP7 has been shown to interact with:

- BRCA1,
- GATAD2B,
- HDAC1,
- MTA2,
- Retinoblastoma protein,
- SAP30, and
- SIN3A.
