= ELM2 domain =

Identifiers
- Symbol: ELM2
- InterPro: IPR000949
- PROSITE: PDOC51156
Available protein structures:
- PDB: IPR000949
- AlphaFold: IPR000949

The ELM2 domain is a protein motif found in transcriptional corepressors such as CoREST and MTA1. The name ELM2 is an acronym standing for Egl-27 and MTA1 homology 2. This domain helps recruit HDAC proteins to corepression complexes to further down regulate gene expression by making chromatin less accessible through deacetylating of histones.
