= MTA1 =

Protein-coding gene in the species Homo sapiens

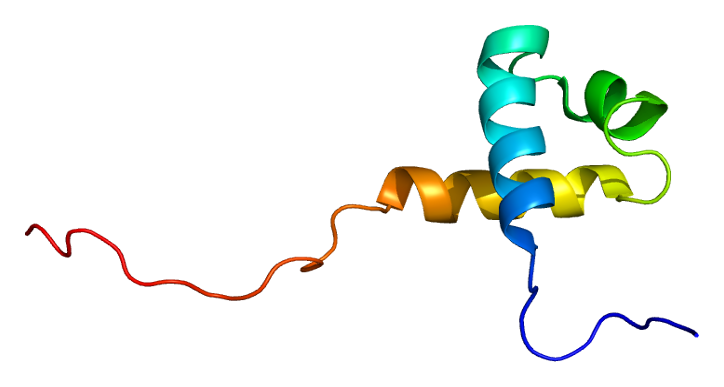

Identifiers
- Aliases: MTA1, metastasis associated 1
- External IDs: OMIM: 603526; MGI: 2150037; GeneCards: MTA1
Available structures
PDB	Ortholog search: PDBe RCSB
PDB	List of PDB id codes 4BKX, 4PBY, 4PBZ, 4PC0, 5ICN, 5FXY

Gene location (Human)
Chr.	Chromosome 14 (human)
Band	14q32.33	Start	105,419,820 bp
Band	14q32.33	End	105,470,729 bp

Gene location (Mouse)
Chr.	Chromosome 12 (mouse)
Band	12|12 F1	Start	113,061,898 bp
Band	12|12 F1	End	113,100,826 bp
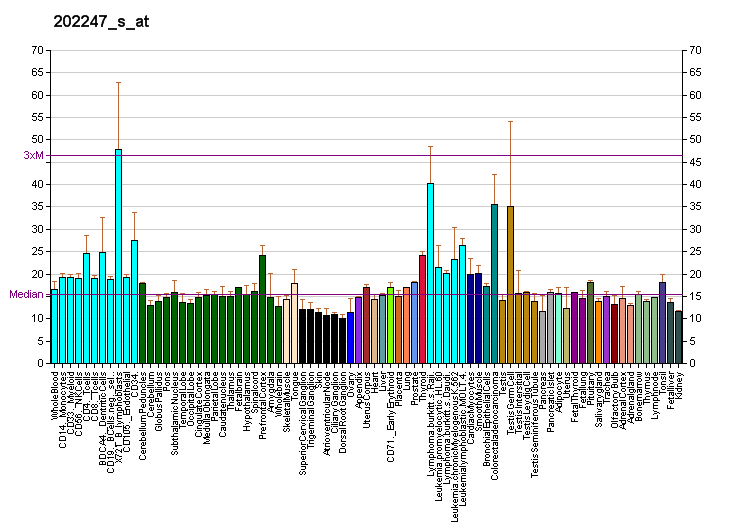

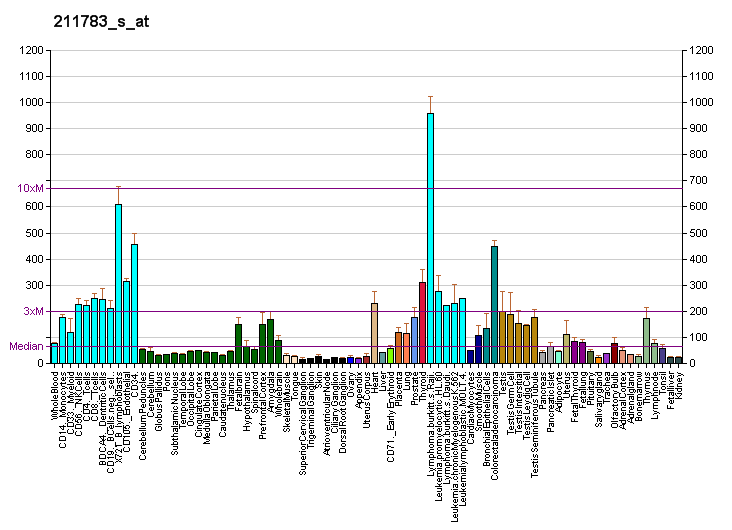
RNA expression pattern
Bgee	Human / Mouse (ortholog); Top expressed in: right uterine tube; right lobe of thyroid gland; left lobe of thyroid gland; apex of heart; right ovary; left ovary; right hemisphere of cerebellum; left uterine tube; canal of the cervix; anterior pituitary / Top expressed in: somite; tail of embryo; ventricular zone; epiblast; genital tubercle; mandibular prominence; molar; maxillary prominence; yolk sac; hand; More reference expression data
BioGPS	More reference expression data
Gene ontology
Molecular function	DNA binding; sequence-specific DNA binding; transcription corepressor activity; DNA-binding transcription factor activity; transcription coactivator activity; zinc ion binding; chromatin binding; metal ion binding; core promoter sequence-specific DNA binding; protein binding; histone deacetylase activity; DNA-binding transcription factor activity, RNA polymerase II-specific; RNA polymerase II cis-regulatory region sequence-specific DNA binding; histone deacetylase binding
Cellular component	cytoplasm; nuclear envelope; intracellular membrane-bounded organelle; nucleoplasm; microtubule; cytoskeleton; nucleus; cytosol; NuRD complex
Biological process	response to ionizing radiation; regulation of transcription, DNA-templated; regulation of gene expression, epigenetic; rhythmic process; circadian regulation of gene expression; transcription, DNA-templated; positive regulation of protein autoubiquitination; double-strand break repair; entrainment of circadian clock by photoperiod; signal transduction; proteasome-mediated ubiquitin-dependent protein catabolic process; locomotor rhythm; histone deacetylation; negative regulation of nucleic acid-templated transcription; regulation of transcription by RNA polymerase II; positive regulation of nucleic acid-templated transcription; negative regulation of transcription by RNA polymerase II
Sources:Amigo / QuickGO
Orthologs
Databases	NCBI: entry; OMA: entry
Species	Human	Mouse
Entrez	9112	116870
Ensembl	ENSG00000182979	ENSMUSG00000021144
UniProt	Q13330	Q8K4B0
RefSeq (mRNA)	NM_001203258; NM_004689	NM_054081; NM_001346696; NM_001364620; NM_001364621; NM_001364622 NM_001364623
RefSeq (protein)	NP_001190187; NP_004680	NP_001333625; NP_473422; NP_001351549; NP_001351550; NP_001351551 NP_001351552
Location (UCSC)	Chr 14: 105.42 – 105.47 Mb	Chr 12: 113.06 – 113.1 Mb
PubMed search
- Wikidata
View/Edit Human	View/Edit Mouse

Metastasis-associated protein MTA1 is a protein that in humans is encoded by the MTA1 gene. MTA1 is the founding member of the MTA family of genes. MTA1 is primarily localized in the nucleus but also found to be distributed in the extra-nuclear compartments. MTA1 is a component of several chromatin remodeling complexes including the nucleosome remodeling and deacetylation complex (NuRD). MTA1 regulates gene expression by functioning as a coregulator to integrate DNA-interacting factors to gene activity. MTA1 participates in physiological functions in the normal and cancer cells. MTA1 is one of the most upregulated proteins in human cancer and associates with cancer progression, aggressive phenotypes, and poor prognosis of cancer patients.

== Discovery ==
MTA1 was first cloned by Toh, Pencil and Nicholson in 1994 as a differentially expressed gene in a highly metastatic rat breast cancer cell line. The role in MTA1 in chromatin remodeling was deduced due to the presence of MTA1 polypeptides in the NuRD complex. The first direct target of the MTA1-NuRD complex was ERα. MTA2 was initially recognized as MTA1-like 1 gene, named as MTA1-L1, as a randomly selected clone from a large-scale sequencing effort of human cDNAs by Takashi Tokino's laboratory. MTA2's suspected role in chromatin remodeling was inferred from the prevalence of MTA2 polypeptides with the NuRD complex in a proteomic study.

== Gene and spliced variants ==
The MTA1 is 715/703 amino acids long, coded by one of three genes of the MTA family and localized on chromosome 14q32 in human and on chromosome 12F in mouse. There are 21 exons spread over a region of about 51-kb in human MTA1. Alternative splicing from 21 exons generates 20 transcripts, ranging from 416-bp to 2.9-kb long. However, open-reading frames are present only in eight spliced transcripts which code six proteins and two polypeptides and remaining transcripts are non-coding long RNAs some of which retain intron sequences. Murine Mta1 contains three protein coding transcripts and three non-coding RNA transcripts. Among human MTA1 variants, only two spliced variants are characterized: ZG29p variant is derived from the c-terminal MTA1, with 251 amino acids and 29-kDa molecular weight; and MTA1s variant generated from alternative splicing of a middle exon followed by a frame-shift, is 430 amino acids and 47-kDa molecular weight.

== Protein domains ==
The conserved domains of MTA1 include a BAH (Bromo-Adjacent Homology), an ELM2 domain (egl-27 and MTA1 homology), a SANT (SWI, ADA2, N-CoR, TFIIIB-B) and a GATA-like zinc finger. The C-terminal divergent region of MTA1 has an Src homology 3-binding domain, acidic regions, and nuclear localization signals. The presence of these domains revealed the role of MTA1 in interactions with modified or unmodified histone and non-histone proteins, chromatin remodeling, and modulation of gene transcription. MTA1 undergoes multiple post-translation modifications: acetylation on lysine 626, ubiquitination on lysine 182 and lysine 626, sumoylation on lysine 509, and methylation on lysine 532. The structural insights of MTA1 domains are deduced from studies involving complexes with HDAC1 or RbAp48 subunits of the NuRD complexes. The MTA1s variant is an N-terminal portion of MTA1 without nuclear localization sequence but contains a novel sequence of 33 amino acids in its C-terminal region. The novel sequence harbors a nuclear receptor binding motif LXXLL which confers MTA1 with an ability to interact with estrogen receptor alpha or other type I nuclear receptors. The ZG29p variant represents the c-terminal MTA1 with two proline-rich SH3 binding sites.

== Regulation ==
Expression of MTA1 is influenced by transcription and non-transcriptional mechanisms. MTA1 expression is regulated by growth factors, growth factor receptors, oncogenes, environmental stress, ionizing radiation, inflammation, and hypoxia. The transcription of MTA1 is stimulated by transcriptional factors including, c-Myc, SP1, CUTL1 homeodomain, NF-ḵB, HSF1, HIF-1a, and Clock/BMAL1 complex, and inhibited by p53. Non-genomic mechanisms of MTA1 expression include post-transcriptional regulations such as ubiquitination by RING-finger ubiquitin-protein ligase COP1 or interaction with tumor suppressor ARF [24] or micro-RNAs such as miR-30c, miR-661 and miR-125a-3p.

== Targets ==
Functions of MTA1 are regulated by its post-translational modifications, modulating the roles of effector molecules, interacting with other regulatory proteins and chromatin remodeling machinery, and modulating the expression of target genes via interacting with the components of the NuRD complex including HDACs.

MTA1 suppresses transcription of breast cancer type 1 susceptibility gene, PTEN, p21^{WAF}, guanine nucleotide-binding protein G(i) subunit alpha-2, SMAD family member 7, nuclear receptor subfamily 4 group A member 1, and homeobox protein SIX3, and represses BCL11B as well as E-cadherin expression.

MTA1 is a dual coregulatory as it stimulates the transcription of Stat3, breast cancer-amplified sequence 3, FosB, paired box gene 5, transglutaminase 2, myeloid differentiation primary response 88, tumor suppressorp14/p19ARF, tyrosine hydroxylase, clock gene CRY1, SUMO2, and Wnt1 and rhodopsin due to release of their transcriptional inhibition by homeodomain protein Six3,

MTA1 interacts with ERα and coregulatory factors such as MAT1, MICoA, and LMO4, which inhibits ER transactivation activity. MTA1 also deacetylate its target proteins such as p53 and HIF and modulates their transactivation functions. Furthermore, MTA1 could potentially modulate the expression of target genes through the microRNA network as MTA1 knockdown results modulation of miR-210, miR-125b, miR-194, miR-103, and miR-500.

== Cellular functions ==
MTA1 modulates the expression of target genes due to its ability to act as a corepressor or coactivator. MTA1 targets and/or effector pathways regulate pathways with cellular functions in both normal and cancer cells. Physiological functions of MTA1 include: its role in the brain due to MTA1 interactions with DJ1 and endophilin-3; regulation of rhodopsin expression in the mouse eye; modifier of circadian rhythm due to MTA1 interactions with the CLOCK-BMAL1 complex and stimulation of Cry-transcription; in heart development due to MTA1-FOG2 interaction; in mammary gland development as MTA1 depletion leads to ductal hypobranching, in spermatogenesis; in immunomodulation due to differential effects on the expression of cytokines in the resting and activated macrophage; in liver regeneration following hepatic injury; differentiation of mesenchymal stem cells into osteogenic axis; and a component of DNA-damage response. In cancer cells, MTA1 and its downstream effectors regulate genes and/or pathways with roles in transformation, invasion, survival, angiogenesis, epithelial-to-mesenchymal transition, metastasis, DNA damage response, and hormone-independence of breast cancer.
