= ECD =

ECD may refer to:

- Early childhood development
- Endocardial Cushion Defect Heart structural defect
- Eastern Caribbean dollar
- Eastern Continental Divide in North America
- ECD (gene)
- E. C. Drury School for the Deaf, in Milton, Ontario, Canada
- Electronic Commerce Directive 2000
- Electronic Control Device, a TASER or stun gun
- Economic Crime Department of the City of London Police
- Electron capture detector
- Electron-capture dissociation
- Electronic civil disobedience
- Energy Citations Database, maintained by the United States Department of Energy
- Energy Conversion Devices, an American photovoltaics manufacturer
- English country dance, a type of social dance
- Equine Cushing's disease
- Erdheim–Chester disease
- EuroCity Direct, an international train service between the Netherlands and Belgium
- Evidence Centered Design, a meta-framework for the design, development and implementation of assessments
- Expanded criteria donor, a class of organ donors
- Explanatory combinatorial dictionary
- ECD Corporation, a defunct computer and electronics company
