= Homeobox protein cut-like 1 =

Protein found in humans

CUX1
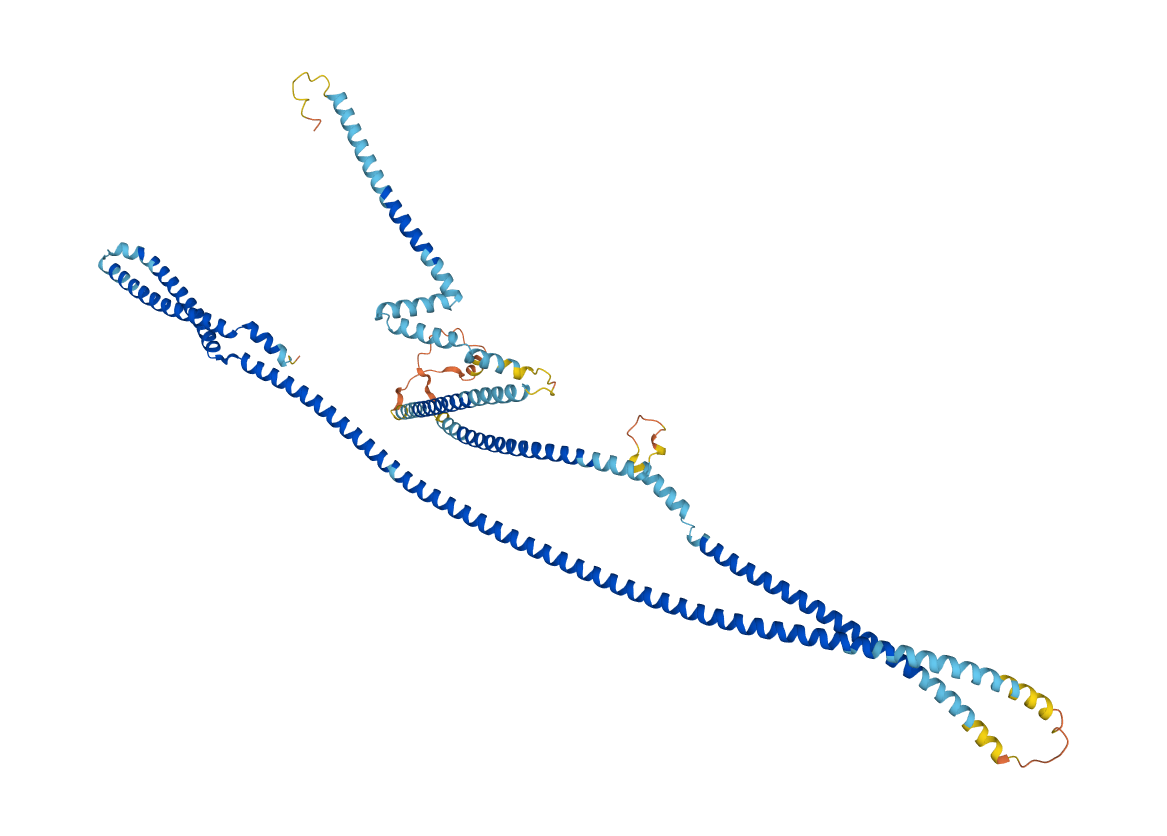

Identifiers
- Aliases: CUX1, CASP, CDP, CDP/Cut, CDP1, COY1, CUTL1, CUX, Clox, Cux/CDP, GOLIM6, Nbla10317, p100, p110, p200, p75, cut like homeobox 1, GDDI
- External IDs: OMIM: 116896; GeneCards: CUX1

Gene location (Human)
Chr.	Chromosome 7 (human)
Band	7q22.1	Start	101,815,904 bp
Band	7q22.1	End	102,283,958 bp
RNA expression pattern
Bgee	Human / Mouse (ortholog); Top expressed in: secondary oocyte; buccal mucosa cell; stromal cell of endometrium; ganglionic eminence; right hemisphere of cerebellum; right coronary artery; sural nerve; myometrium; body of uterus; apex of heart / n/a; More reference expression data
BioGPS	n/a
Gene ontology
Molecular function	sequence-specific DNA binding; DNA binding; protein tyrosine kinase activity; RNA polymerase II transcription regulatory region sequence-specific DNA binding; protein-macromolecule adaptor activity; protein binding; DNA-binding transcription factor activity, RNA polymerase II-specific
Cellular component	cytosol; Golgi apparatus; nucleus; nucleoplasm; Golgi membrane; integral component of membrane; integral component of Golgi membrane; membrane
Biological process	regulation of transcription by RNA polymerase II; multicellular organism development; retrograde transport, vesicle recycling within Golgi; positive regulation of dendrite morphogenesis; regulation of transcription, DNA-templated; negative regulation of transcription by RNA polymerase II; transcription, DNA-templated; peptidyl-tyrosine phosphorylation; Golgi vesicle transport; intra-Golgi vesicle-mediated transport
Sources:Amigo / QuickGO
Orthologs
Databases	NCBI: entry; OMA: entry
Species	Human	Mouse
Entrez	1523	n/a
Ensembl	ENSG00000257923	n/a
UniProt	P39880; Q13948	n/a
RefSeq (mRNA)	NM_001202543; NM_001202544; NM_001202545; NM_001202546; NM_001913 NM_181500; NM_181552	n/a
RefSeq (protein)	NP_001189472; NP_001189473; NP_001189474; NP_001189475; NP_001904 NP_852477; NP_853530; NP_001189473.1; NP_001189474.1; NP_001189475.1; NP_001904.2; NP_852477.1	n/a
Location (UCSC)	Chr 7: 101.82 – 102.28 Mb	n/a
PubMed search		n/a
- Wikidata
View/Edit Human

Homeobox protein cut-like 1 is a protein that in humans is encoded by the CUX1 gene (previously CUTL1). This protein is a homeodomain protein.

The term "cut" in the name "cut-like 1" derives from the "cut wing" phenotype observed in a mutant of Drosophila melanogaster. In mammals, a CCAAT-displacement activity was originally described in DNA binding assays. The human gene was identified following purification of the CCAAT-displacement protein (CDP) and has been successively been called CDP, Cut-like 1 (CUTL1), CDP/Cut and finally, CUX1. (Consequently, a literature search for CUX1 fails to bring up many of the earlier studies). Cut homeobox genes are present in all metazoans. In mammals, CUX1 is expressed ubiquitously in all tissues. A second gene, called CUX2, is expressed primarily in neuronal cells.

== Gene ==
The human CUX1 gene is large, encompassing more than 440,000 base pairs with two alternative first exons and an additional 23 exons. The last exon has a weak polyadenylation site allowing RNA polymerase II often to continue transcribing until it reaches an additional 10 exons. Splicing of this longer transcript from exon 14 to exon 25 generates a mature mRNA that codes for a protein that was called CASP (Cut alternatively spliced product). CASP localizes to the Golgi and does not seem to impact at all on CUX1 function. However, because of the complex structure of the gene, most oligos in microarrays were derived from the most 3' exons that are unique to CASP. Thus, until the advent of RNA sequencing CUX1 expression data has been essentially limited to immunohistochemical analyses. Similarly, many guide RNAs in CRISPR-Cas screening studies target the CASP-specific exons and do not affect CUX1.

== Structure ==
The use of two transcription start sites, alternative splicing of some exons and proteolytic processing combine to generate several CUX1 protein isoforms (reviewed) The full-length protein, often referred to as p200 CUX1, contains five evolutionarily conserved domains: a coiled-coil (CC), three Cut domains (C1, C2 and C3), originally called Cut repeats (CRs), and a Cut homeodomain (HD). The coiled-coil's function remains to be defined. The three Cut domains and the Cut homeodomain were originally characterized as DNA binding domains, and were later found to be involved also in protein-protein interactions. In addition to these conserved domains, the n-terminal 100 amino acids contains an autoinhibitory domain, while the carboxy-terminal region downstream of the homeodomain was shown to function as an active repression domain. In mid to late G1, the full-length protein is proteolytically processed to generate a shorter isoform, p110 CUX1 that lacks approximately the n-terminal 747 amino acids and thus contains only 3 DNA binding domains: CUT domains 2 and 3 and the Cut homeodomain (C2C3HD).

DNA binding assays with histidine-tagged fusion proteins showed that one Cut domain is not sufficient for DNA binding, while several combination of domains were found to bind to DNA with distinct affinities and kinetics: CR1CR2, CR3HD and CR2CR3HD. The C1C2 protein displayed very rapid "on" and "off" DNA binding rates, whereas any combination of a Cut domain with the Cut homeodomain exhibited slower binding kinetics. Interestingly, the full-length CUX1 protein purified from insect cells exhibited DNA binding kinetics similar to that of CR1CR2, suggesting that the Cut homeodomain may not be active in the context of the full-length protein.

== Function ==
The protein encoded by this gene is a member of the homeodomain family of DNA binding proteins. It regulates gene expression, morphogenesis, and differentiation and it also plays a role in cell cycle progression, particularly at S-phase. Several alternatively spliced transcript variants of this gene have been described, but the full-length nature of some of these variants has not been determined, and the p200 isoform of Cux1 is processed proteolytically to smaller active isoforms, such as p110. Cux1 DNA binding is stimulated by activation of the PAR2/F2RL1 cell-surface G-protein-coupled receptor in fibroblasts and breast-cancer epithelial cells to regulate Matrix metalloproteinase 10, Interleukin1-alpha, and Cyclo-oxygenase 2 (COX2) genes.

Multiple reviews have detailed the tissue-specific functions and genetic interactions in Drosophila and the early characterization of the CDP in mammalian cells, expression and activity of CUX1 in the myeloid cell lineage, multiple CUX1 isoforms, modes of DNA binding, early mouse models and cell-based assays, roles of CUX1 in kidney development and homeostasis, mechanisms by which CUX1 stimulates cell migration and invasion, roles of CUX1 and CUX2 in neurons of the cortex upper layer and the paradoxical implications of CUX1 in cancer. In addition, a number of commentaries present more specific views and speculations.

=== Biochemical activities ===
p200 CUX1 is a very abundant protein that binds to DNA with extremely fast kinetics (rapid "on" and "off" rates). This is not consistent with a role as a classical transcription factor that binds stably to DNA and recruits a co-activator or a co-repressor, however, the p200 CUX1 protein may still be able to repress transcription by competition for binding site occupancy. Indeed, CUX1 was originally purified as the CCAAT-displacement protein (CDP). In addition to this potential role in transcriptional repression, recent studies revealed that p200 CUX1 functions as an auxiliary factor in base excision repair. In vitro, CUT domains of CUX1 stimulate the enzymatic activities of the 8-oxoguanine DNA glycosylase (OGG1) and the apurinic/apyrimidinic endonuclease 1 (APE1). In agreement with results from in vitro DNA repair assays, a p200 CUX1-GFP fusion protein is rapidly recruited to DNA damage generated by laser microirradiation, while CUX1 knockdown in human cells causes a delay in the repair of oxidative DNA damage and mono-alkylated bases in genomic DNA, and sensitizes cancer cells to treatments with H_{2}O_{2}, ionizing radiation and the mono-alkylating agent temozolomide. Conversely, p200 CUX1 overexpression increases the resistance of cancer cells to the same treatments. Structure/function analysis established that a fusion protein containing Cut domains 1 and 2 linked to a nuclear localization signal (C1C2-NLS) is rapidly recruited to DNA damage and is sufficient to accelerate the repair oxidative DNA damage and mono-alkylated bases in genomic DNA. Since the C1C2-NLS protein is devoid of transcription activation potential, these results suggest that Cut domains are directly involved in DNA repair.

=== Transcriptional activities ===
The shorter p110 CUX1 isoform stably interacts with DNA and can function as transcriptional repressor or activator depending on promoter context. Transcription and cell-based assays demonstrated a role for p110 CUX1 in stimulating cell cycle progression and cell proliferation, strengthening of the spindle assembly checkpoint, ensuring an efficient DNA damage response, promoting cell migration and invasion, and increasing resistance to apoptotic signals. Of note, the p200 CUX1 protein was inactive in all these transcriptional and cell-based assays.

p110 CUX1 has been demonstrated to bind the protective allele of FTO single nucleotide polymorphisms (SNPs) rs8050136 or rs1421085 highly associated with human obesity, and promote the expression of RPGRIP1L. RPGRIP1L hypomorphism in mice results in obesity, suggesting an important role of CUX1 in body weight regulation.

== Clinical significance ==
=== Role in tumor growth ===
Genetic data from over 7,600 cancer patients shows that over 1% has the deactivated CUX1 which links to progression of tumor growth. Researchers from the Wellcome Trust Sanger Institute reported that the mutation of CUX1 reduces the inhibitory effects of a biological inhibitor, PIK3IP1 (phosphoinositide-3-kinase interacting protein 1), resulted in higher activity of the growth promoting enzyme, phosphoinositide 3-kinase (PI3K) which leads to tumor progression. Although CUX1 is mutated at a lower rate compared to other known gene mutations that cause cancer, this deactivated gene is found across many cancer types in this study to be the underlying cause of the disease.

=== Overexpression in cancers ===
CUX1 is overexpressed in many cancers. The comprehensive molecular characterization of human colon and rectal cancer performed by The Cancer Genome Atlas (TCGA) ranked CUX1 as the fifth gene on a scale showing a correlation between tumour aggressiveness and gene expression/somatic copy number alterations. TCGA and REMBRANDT data also show shorter survival of glioblastoma patients with high CUX1 mRNA expression (reviewed). In smaller scale studies, immunohistochemical analyses on breast, pancreas and glioblastoma cancers reveal that CUX1 expression inversely correlates with relapse-free and overall survival. An alternative CUX1 transcript that is initiated within intron 20 and codes for a p75 isoform is expressed specifically in the testis and thymus. This transcript was found to be aberrantly expressed in many breast tumour cells lines and breast tumours. Transgenic mice expressing this transcript in mammary epithelial cells were shown to develop mammary tumours with metastasis to the lung.

=== Tumors in CUX1 transgenic mice ===
CUX1 transgenic mice develop tumors in multiple organs and tissues after a long latency period. Transgenic mice expressing either p75, p110 or p200 CUX1 in mammary epithelial cells develop mammary tumours with a low penetrance (~20%) and with a long latency period. Metastasis to the lung was observed in three cases of mammary tumors expressing p75 CUX1.

The mechanisms of action differ widely between p110 CUX1 and p200 CUX1. Transgenic mice expressing p110 CUX1 in mammary epithelial cells develop mammary tumors that exhibit a sub-tetraploid chromosome number, suggesting passage through tetraploidy resulting from cytokinesis failure. Cells do not usually survive as tetraploid with multiple centrosomes. Overexpression of p110 CUX1 was shown to activate a transcriptional program that reinforces the spindle assembly checkpoint and delays mitosis until extranumerary centrosomes have clustered to two poles, thereby enabling bipolar mitosis and survival of tetraploid cells. Yet, passage through a multipolar intermediate enriches for merotelic chromosome attachments, leading to chromosome mis-segregation and the rapid generation of aneuploid populations from which tumorigenic cells emerge.

Tumors that develop in p200 CUX1 transgenic mice reveal a different mode of action, as 44% of these tumors harboured a spontaneous mutation activating the Kras gene. The cooperation between RAS and p200 CUX1 was confirmed by lentiviral infections in the lung. RAS oncogenes do not transform primary cells, but instead cause cellular senescence. This results from the elevated production of reactive oxygen species (ROS) that lead to oxidative DNA damage. Biochemical and cell-based assays demonstrated that the CUT domains within CUX1 and other Cut domain proteins stimulate the enzymatic activities of some enzymes of the base excision repair pathway and accelerate the repair of oxidative DNA damage. Hence, human and primary rodent fibroblasts that are transfected with KRAS and CUX1 exhibit similar ROS levels as cells that receive only KRAS but show much reduced DNA damage. In agreement with these findings, CUX1 knockdown is synthetic lethal in all cancer cells exhibiting high levels of ROS as a consequence of activating mutations in either KRAS, HRAS, BRAF or EGFR.

=== Tumor suppressor ===
Loss-of-heterozygosity (LOH) of the 7q22.1 chromosomal region, where CUX1 resides, was reported in 8–22% of various cancer, and in close to 50% in therapy-associated leukemias. As no inactivating mutations were found in the remaining allele, the notion that CUX1 could be the tumor suppressor gene on 7q22.1 was dismissed for some time. However, refined mapping in leiomyomas and myeloid leukemias eventually pointed to CUX1 as the sole tumor suppressor gene in this region. These genetic data suggest that CUX1 may be a haploinsufficient tumor suppressor gene. In addition to LOH events, large scale DNA sequencing identified inactivating point mutations in 1–5% of cancers where both alleles are present. There is no tumor case where both CUX1 allele are inactivated.

While the biochemical activities of CUX1 that explain its role in tumor maintenance and progression have been well defined, the biochemical functions of CUX1 involved in tumor suppression have yet to be firmly established. Two mechanisms have been proposed. One study reported that CUX1 functions as a transcriptional activator of PIK3IP1, a gene that codes for the phosphoinositide-3-kinase interacting protein 1 (PIK3IP1), a direct inhibitor of the PI3K p110 catalytic subunit. CUX1 knockdown caused a decrease in PIK3IP1 expression that was associated with an increase in PI3K signaling and AKT signaling. A separate study, however, argued that CUX1 is itself a target of AKT signaling. Activation of the PI3K–AKT signaling pathway by insulin-like growth factor 1 (IGF1) or by AKT2 overexpression led to the upregulation of CUX1 and was associated with resistance to apoptosis, whereas treatment of cells with the PI3K inhibitor LY294002 decreased CUX1 expression and increased apoptosis. Whether the discrepancies in the results and conclusions from these two studies can be explained by differences in cell-types or other reasons remains to be verified. The auxiliary role of CUX1 in base excision repair has raised the possibility that its tumor suppressor function may be linked to its function in DNA repair. CUX1 knockdown delays DNA repair in multiple cell lines. Mouse embryo fibroblasts (MEFs) derived from a Cux1-/- knockout mouse exhibit increased genomic instability23, moreover Cux1+/−- heterozygous MEFs are haploinsufficient for DNA repair18. Yet, whether CUX1 hemizygosity augments the risk of cancer by increasing the frequency of mutations and/or genomic rearrangements remains to be formally tested.

== CASP ==
Model of tethering involving CASP.

The CUX1 gene Alternatively Spliced Product was first reported in 1997. (Note: This CASP is not the same as the scaffolding protein called CASP for Cytohesin/ARNO ... Scaffolding Protein) The CUX1 gene has up to 33 exons. CASP mRNA includes exons 1 through 14 and 25 through 33. The human CASP protein is predicted to contain 678 amino acids, of which 400 are shared with CUTL1. CASP protein is approximately 80 kD. It lacks the DNA binding region of CUTL1, but instead contains a trans-membrane domain that allows it to insert into lipid bilayers. It has been localized to the Golgi apparatus.

CASP has been reported to be part of a complex with Golgin 84 that tethers COPI vesicles and is important for retrograde transport in the Golgi and between the Golgi and endoplasmic reticulum. The targeting of vesicles involves tethers and SNAREs.

== Interactions ==
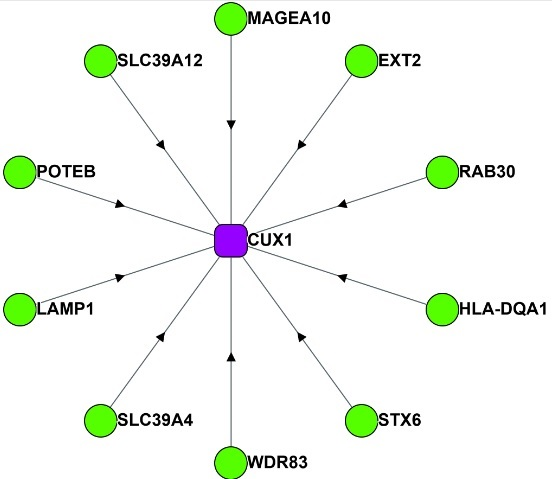
The CUX1 network identified in the BioPlex searchable website.

Cux1 (CUTL1, CDP, CDP/Cux) has been shown to interact with:

- CREB binding protein,
- Retinoblastoma protein, and
- SATB1

These physical interactions are reported in BioPlex 2.0

- MAGEA10
- EXT2
- RAB30
- HLA-DQA1
- STX6
- WDR83
- SLC39A4
- LAMP1
- POTEB
- SLC39A12
