= KIAA1143 =

Human protein

Identifiers
- Aliases: KIAA1143
- External IDs: MGI: 1913452; GeneCards: KIAA1143

Gene location (Human)
Chr.	Chromosome 3 (human)
Band	3p21.31	Start	44,737,661 bp
Band	3p21.31	End	44,761,619 bp

Gene location (Mouse)
Chr.	Chromosome 9 (mouse)
Band	9|9 F4	Start	122,774,154 bp
Band	9|9 F4	End	122,780,065 bp
RNA expression pattern
Bgee	Human / Mouse (ortholog); Top expressed in: Achilles tendon; corpus callosum; endometrium; skeletal muscle tissue; islet of Langerhans; ventricular zone; ganglionic eminence; smooth muscle tissue; muscle of thigh; gastrocnemius muscle / Top expressed in: medial ganglionic eminence; interventricular septum; facial motor nucleus; calvaria; primary oocyte; olfactory epithelium; secondary oocyte; condyle; myocardium of ventricle; atrioventricular valve; More reference expression data
BioGPS	n/a
Orthologs
Databases	NCBI: entry; OMA: entry
Species	Human	Mouse
Entrez	57456	66202
Ensembl	ENSG00000163807; ENSG00000281665	ENSMUSG00000032551
UniProt	Q96AT1	Q8K039
RefSeq (mRNA)	NM_020696; NM_001320334	NM_025419
RefSeq (protein)	NP_001307263; NP_065747	NP_079695
Location (UCSC)	Chr 3: 44.74 – 44.76 Mb	Chr 9: 122.77 – 122.78 Mb
PubMed search
- Wikidata
View/Edit Human	View/Edit Mouse

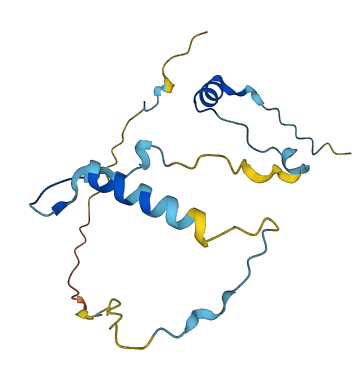
3D AI generated tertiary structure of the protein KIAA1143 generated by Alpha fold.

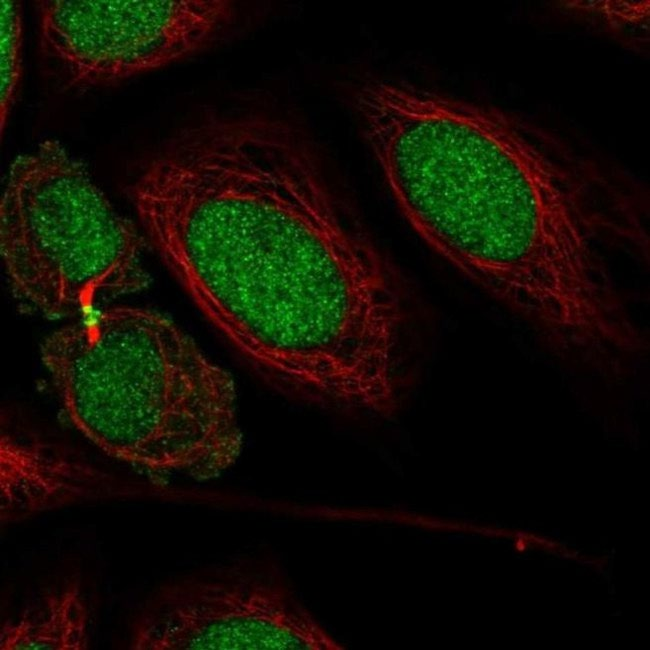
Poly clonal Antibody Staining of KIAA1143 Protein in green staining. Micro tubules are counter stained in red. Shows localization to nucleus and cytokinetic bridge.

KIAA1143 is an uncharacterized protein in humans that is encoded by the KIAA1143 gene. it may play a role in cell growth mechanisms and regulation/creation of cytoskeletal structure. This gene is located on chromosome 3 on the minus strand

This protein has a function that is not yet objectively understood. KIAA1143 has no alias and has the longest most functional variant named as uncharacterized protein KIAA1143 isoform 1. The mature mRNA transcript is 5079 Base pairs long while the length of the KIAA1143 protein is 154 amino acids. KIAA1143 has another transcript variant called KIAA1143 variant 2, which contains an alternate 3' terminal exon, resulting in a distinct 3' coding region and 3' UTR, compared to variant 1. The encoded isoform 2 has a distinct C-terminus and is shorter than isoform 1. The KIAA1143 protein belongs to the uncharacterized protein KIAA1143-like Family, and contains DUF4604 domain of unknown function. KIAA1143 has a predicted function of cell structure/mobility by encoding heavy neurofilament subunits in neurons. Immunohistochemistry staining from Thermo Fisher Scientific shows presence of KIAA1143 in a cytokinetic bridge, which is involved in cellular cytokinesis. This indicates KIAA1143 may have a role in regulation of cellular division and/or communication as well.

== Gene ==
=== Location ===
KIAA1143 is found on chromosome 3 on the short arm (3p21) and has 3 exons. KIAA1143 is on the Minus Strand. KIAA1143 is on the sense strand and spans from bases 44,690,802-44,819,561. KIAA1143 is located in the gene neighborhood of Zinc finger protein 502, ZNF501, and KIF15

=== Transcriptional Regulation ===
The KIAA1143 was found by using 500 bp of nucleotides upstream using UCSC Genome Browser A number of transcription factors with a matrix similarity greater than or equal to 0.5 that are predicted to regulate transcription of KIAA1143 are listed below with their respective binding site:

Transcription factor	Binding Site	Strand
Grainy Head like 2 (GHRL2) (Grainyhead-like gene family)	ACAGAAGA	+
Zinc Finer Protein 317 (ZNF317)	AACCTGTC	-
JunD	AGTTGACGTCA	-
CREM	AGTGACGTCAC and GTCACTGCAGT	+ and -
ATF3	AGTGACGTCAC and GTCACTGCAGT	+ and -
ATF7	AGTGACGTCAC and GTCACTGCAGT	+ and -
Jun dimerization protein (JDP2)	AGTGACGTCAC and GTCACTGCAGT	+ and -
FOS::JUN 9(Transcription factor Jun)	ACTGCAGT	+
ZNF682	CCCCGCACCGG	+
KLF13	TGGAACGCC	+
Kruppel like factor 16	GCCCGCCAGG	+
KLF10	CGGGCGGTCC	-
YY2	GGCGGCC	+
LIN54	CTTTGAGC	-

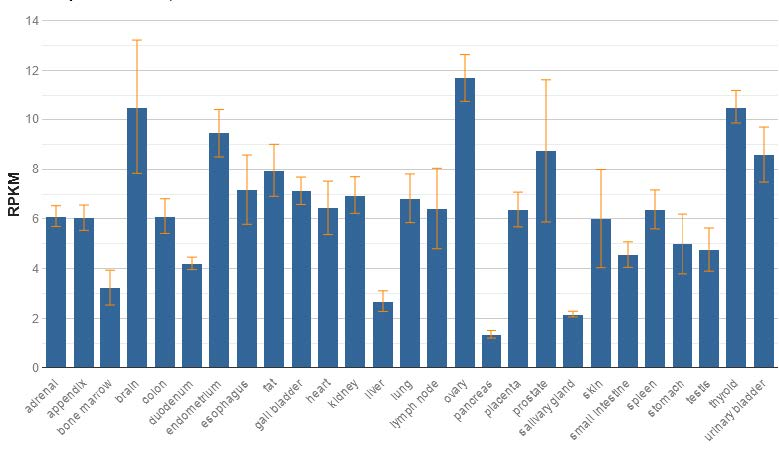
Expression of KIAA1143 in human tissue samples

=== Expression ===
KIAA1143 is expressed in all tissues, however, The expression of KIAA1143 is highest in the Ovaries, followed by the brain, thyroid, prostate, and urinary bladder

KIAA1143 is predicted to have subcellular localization in the nucleus

== mRNA ==
=== Characteristics of Isoform 1 ===
Isoform 1 of KIAA1143 has a 5' UTR region of 17 base pairs and a 3' UTR region of 4597 base pairs. The transcript is 5079 base pairs long

=== Additional Primary Sequence and Variants (Isoforms) ===
KIAA1143 has another uncharacterized isoform 2 which contains an alternate 3' terminal exon, resulting in a distinct 3' coding region and 3' UTR, compared to variant 1. The encoded isoform 2 has a distinct C-terminus and is shorter than isoform 1.

== Protein ==
The theoretical molecular weight of the 154amino acid KIAA1143 protein is 17.5kDa and the theoretical pI is 5.84.

=== Domains, Motifs, and Secondary Structure ===
Since KIAA1143 is an gene with unknown function, most of the coding gene apart from the promotor and translation start site area is a Domain of unknown function, specifically, DUF4604 Spans amino acids 5-151. KIAA1143 has no Cysteine or tyrosine residues. Cysteine and tyrosine are very good nucleophiles, since they are not present, this gives some light into the possible electrophilic nature of the active site. KIAA1143 has some important Eukaryotic Linear Motif resource (ELM) Domains which give insight into its function. These ELM domains are LIG_BIR_II_1 from amino acids 1-5 and LIG_WRC_WIRS_1 from amino acids 144-149. These domains have importance in apoptotic regulation and actin cytoskeleton rearrangement mechanisms respectively

From Positions 1-10 there is also something called a BIG1 Big-1 (bacterial Ig-like domain 1) domain. Big-1 proteins are surface-expressed proteins that mediate mammalian host cell invasion or attachment. The tandem of Ig-like domains appears to form a rod to link the bacterial outer membrane anchor to the C-terminal lectin-like domain to interact with their receptors in the host cell membrane

=== Post-Translational Modifications ===
KIAA1143 is shown to be phosphorylated at positions 2, 50, 68, 113, 115, 116 at either serine or threonine residues. There is a sumoylation consensus at position 76, as well as O-GlcNAc attachment at position 8. There is also an N-myristoylation site from 111-116

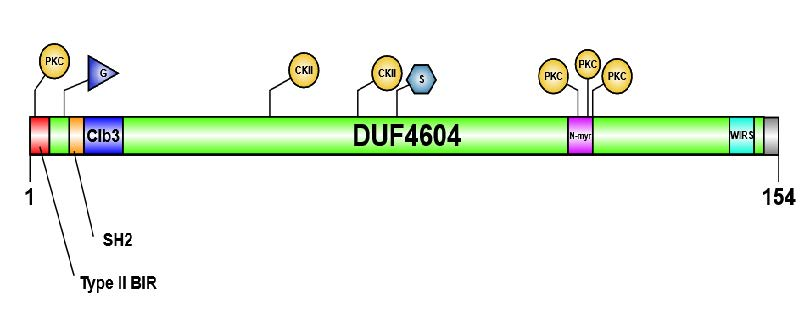
KIAA1143 Protein Isoform 1 significant ELM motifs, and important post translational modifications

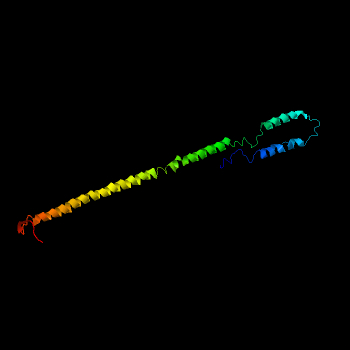
KIAA1143 iTASSER tertiary structure predictive modeling

=== Tertiary Structures ===
The KIAA1143 Tertiary structure is predicted below through iTASSER modeling, with a C score of -2.83. Coloring is similar to alphafold confidence graphing

=== Protein Interactions ===
KIAA1143 is experimentally determined to have interactions with EAPP (E2F-associated phosphoprotein), ECD (Ecdysoneless Cell Cycle Regulator), GPATCH1 (Evolutionarily Conserved G-Patch Domain-Containing Protein), PRPF8 (Pre-MRNA-Processing-Splicing Factor 8), WDR83 (Mitogen-Activated Protein Kinase Organizer 1), CEP76 (centrosomal protein 76), and APP (Amyloid-beta precursor protein).

== Homology and Evolution ==
=== Paralogs ===
There are no paralogs for KIAA1143

=== Orthologs ===
KIAA1143 has homologs in over 200 other organisms, including vertebrates, invertebrates, archaea, KIAA1143 is found in clades of organisms except land plants.

Genus species	Common name	Taxonomic group	Divergence (MYA)	Accession number	Seq. Length (aa)	Corr. ID to HP (%)	Corr. Sim. To HP (%)
Homo sapiens	Human	primates	0	NP_065747.1	154	100	100
Mus musculus	House Mouse	Rodentia	87	NP_079695.2	154	87	93
Pogona vitticeps	Central Bearded Dragon	Reptilla	319	XP_020663315.1	152	72	84
Sphaerodactylus townsendi	townsend's least gecko	Reptilla	319	XP_048366794.1	154	68	81
Zootoca vivipara	Common Lizzard	Reptila	319	XP_034985594.1	153	64	77
Python bivittatus	burmese python	Reptilla	319	XP_007437594.1	151	64	77
Nothoprocta perdicaria	chilean tinamou	Aves	319	XP_025890652.1	159	63	73
Oxyura jamaicensis	Ruddy Duck	Aves	319	XP_035173671.1	159	54	71
Aptenodytes forsteri	Emperor Penguin	Aves	319	XP_019330441.1	159	53	68
Catharus ustulatus	Swainson's thrush	Aves	319	XP_032933984.1	175	53	66
Rhinatrema bivittatum	two-lined caecilian	(Gymnophiona)	353	XP_029445556.1	156	58	76
Geotrypetes seraphini	gaboon caecilian	(Gymnophiona)	353	XP_033786333.1	156	58	78
Rana temporaria	Common frog	(anura)	353	XP_040209069.1	152	58	75
Bufo Bufo	Common Toad	Amphibia (anura)	353	XP_040287819.1	153	57	74
Latimeria Chalumnae	West Indian Ocean coelacanth	Sarcoptergyii (lobe-finned fish)	414	XP_005999062.1	151	46	63
Gambusia affinis	mosquitofish	Cyprinodontiformes (ray-finned fish)	431	XP_043973326.1	160	48	63
Clupea harengus	Atlantic Herring	Clupeiformes (ray-finned fish)	431	XP_012692935.2	154	47	68
Scyliorhinus canicula	Small Spotted catshark	Carcharhiniformes (cartilagenous fish)	464	XP_038652524.1	152	58	79
Amblyraja radiata	Thorny skate	Elasmobranchii (cartilagenous fish)	464	XP_032871011.1	153	50	68
Petromyzon marinus	sea lamprey	Agnatha (jawless fish)	599	XP_032833525.1	178	49	67

The relative rate of change for KIAA1143 is fairly slow compared to fibrinogen and beta-globin, but not as slow as cytochrome c.

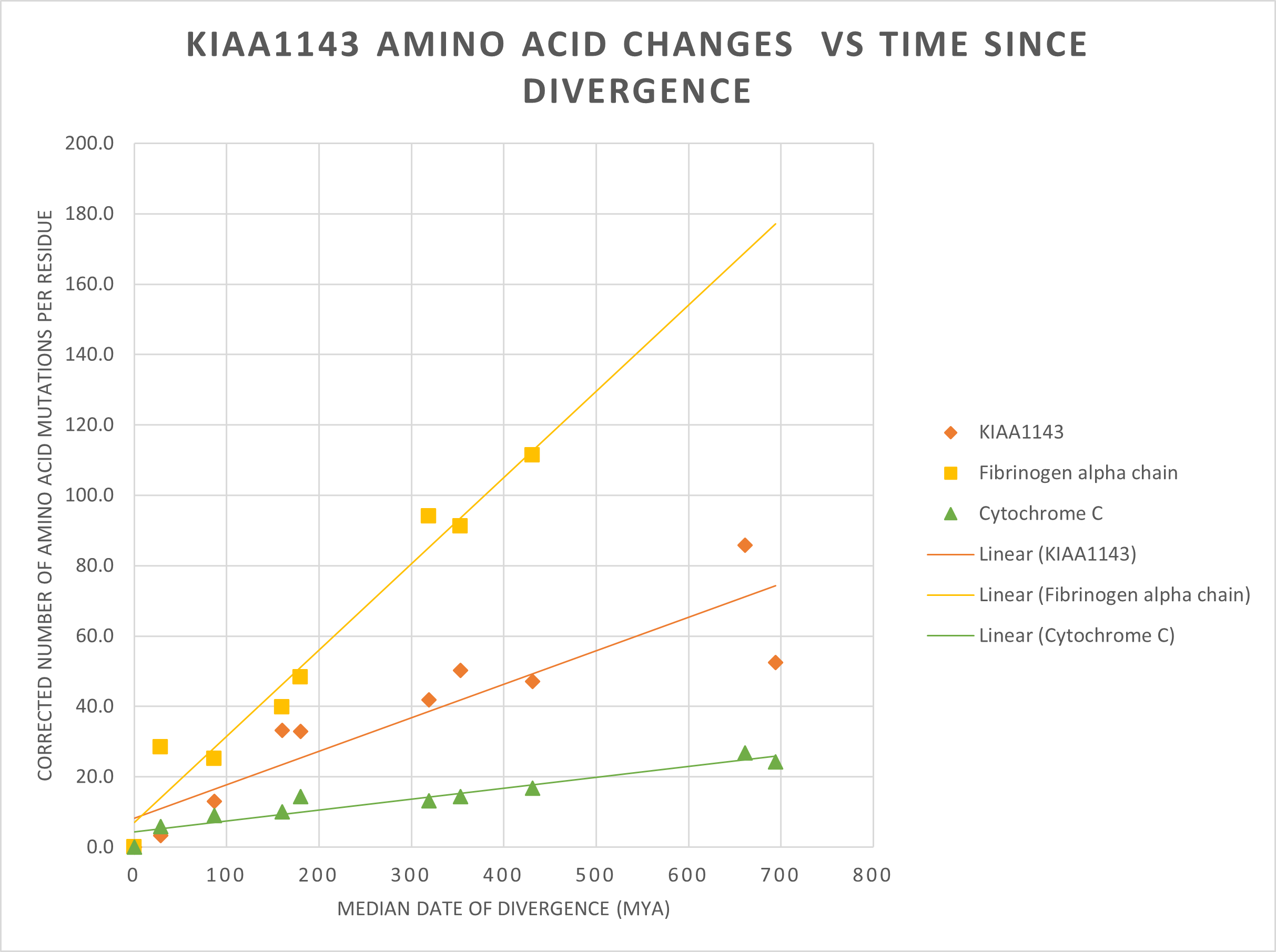
KIAA1143s mutation rate compared to fibrinogen, beta-globin, and cytochrome c.

=== Homologus Domains ===
The DUF4604 domain in KIAA1143 is conserved across all organisms

=== Phylogeny ===
All of the orthologs of KIAA1143 are derived from the same common ancestor

== Clinical Significance ==
=== Pathology ===
No diseases have been shown to be directly linked to KIAA1143 to this date.

=== Disease Association ===
No Disease Association is observed with KIAA1143 to date.
