= BAZ1A =

Protein-coding gene in the species Homo sapiens

Identifiers
- Aliases: BAZ1A, ACF1, WALp1, WCRF180, hACF1, bromodomain adjacent to zinc finger domain 1A
- External IDs: OMIM: 605680; MGI: 1309478; GeneCards: BAZ1A

Gene location (Human)
Chr.	Chromosome 14 (human)
Band	14q13.1-q13.2	Start	34,752,731 bp
Band	14q13.1-q13.2	End	34,875,647 bp

Gene location (Mouse)
Chr.	Chromosome 12 (mouse)
Band	12|12 C1	Start	54,939,774 bp
Band	12|12 C1	End	55,061,133 bp
RNA expression pattern
Bgee	Human / Mouse (ortholog); Top expressed in: sperm; oocyte; secondary oocyte; monocyte; superior surface of tongue; bone marrow; blood; trabecular bone; pericardium; mucosa of pharynx / Top expressed in: spermatocyte; spermatid; morula; granulocyte; spleen; seminiferous tubule; mesenteric lymph nodes; bone marrow; hair follicle; genital tubercle; More reference expression data
BioGPS	n/a
Gene ontology
Molecular function	protein binding; metal ion binding; histone acetyltransferase activity
Cellular component	CHRAC; ACF complex; nucleus
Biological process	DNA-dependent DNA replication; regulation of transcription, DNA-templated; transcription, DNA-templated; chromatin remodeling; regulation of transcription by RNA polymerase II; histone acetylation
Sources:Amigo / QuickGO
Orthologs
Databases	NCBI: entry; OMA: entry
Species	Human	Mouse
Entrez	11177	217578
Ensembl	ENSG00000198604	ENSMUSG00000035021
UniProt	Q9NRL2	O88379
RefSeq (mRNA)	NM_013448; NM_182648	NM_013815
RefSeq (protein)	NP_038476; NP_872589	NP_038843
Location (UCSC)	Chr 14: 34.75 – 34.88 Mb	Chr 12: 54.94 – 55.06 Mb
PubMed search
- Wikidata
View/Edit Human	View/Edit Mouse

Bromodomain adjacent to zinc finger domain protein 1A is a protein that in humans is encoded by the BAZ1A gene.

== Structure ==
The protein encoded by this gene belongs to a family of proteins which includes BAZ1B, BAZ2A, and BAZ2B. All family members contain the following domains and structural motifs:

- N-terminus – PHD finger (C4HC3 zinc finger)
- WAKZ motif
- LH (leucine-rich helical domain) motif
- C-terminus – bromodomain

== Function ==
BAZ1A along with SMARCA5, POLE3, and CHRAC1 comprise the WCRF/CHRAC ATP-dependent chromatin-remodeling complex.

The purified CHRAC complex can mobilize nucleosomes into a regularly spaced nucleosomal array, and the spacing activity is ATP-dependent. Furthermore, the BAZ1A-SMARCA5 complex enables DNA replication through highly condensed regions of chromatin.

== Interactions ==
BAZ1A has been shown to interact with SMARCA5 and SATB1.
