= SATB1 =

Protein-coding gene in the species Homo sapiens

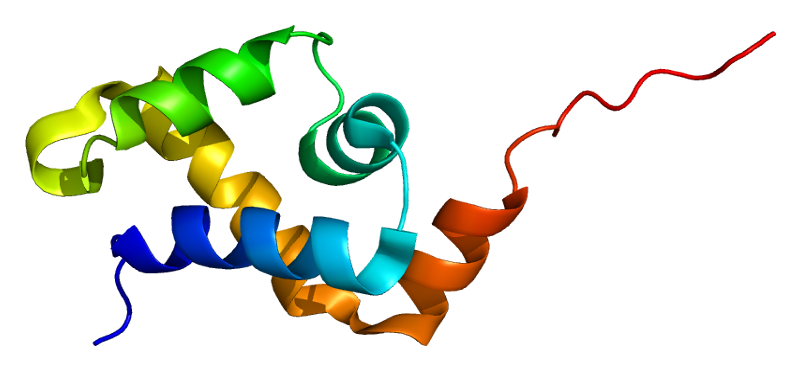

Identifiers
- Aliases: SATB1, SATB homeobox 1, DEFDA, KTZSL, DNA-binding protein SATB1/SATB2, SATB1/SATB2, IPR039673
- External IDs: OMIM: 602075; MGI: 105084; GeneCards: SATB1
Available structures
| PDB | Ortholog search: PDBe RCSB |
| PDB | List of PDB id codes 1YSE, 2L1P, 2O49, 2O4A, 3NZL, 3TUO, 2MW8 |

Gene location (Human)
| Chr. | Chromosome 3 (human) |
| Band | 3p24.3 | Start | 18,345,377 bp |
| Band | 3p24.3 | End | 18,445,588 bp |

Gene location (Mouse)
| Chr. | Chromosome 17 (mouse) |
| Band | 17|17 C | Start | 52,043,215 bp |
| Band | 17|17 C | End | 52,140,318 bp |
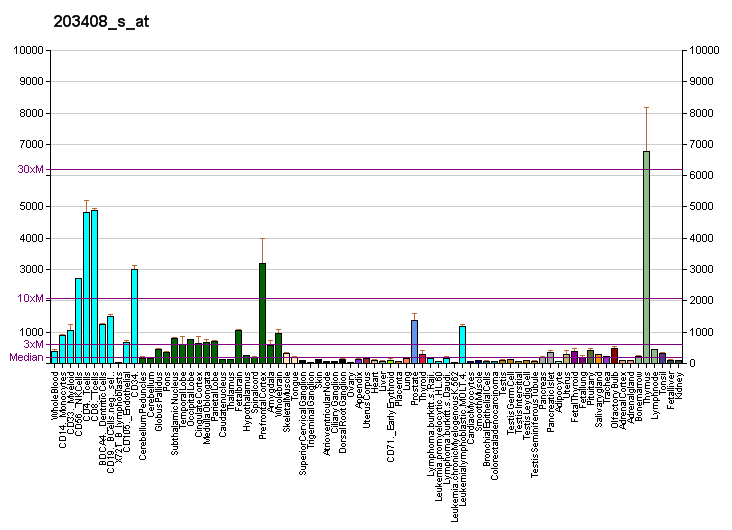
RNA expression pattern
| Bgee | Human / Mouse (ortholog); Top expressed in: orbitofrontal cortex; frontal pole; thymus; Brodmann area 46; parietal lobe; postcentral gyrus; parotid gland; Brodmann area 10; entorhinal cortex; Brodmann area 23 / Top expressed in: thymus; molar; barrel cortex; zygote; secondary oocyte; Rostral migratory stream; substantia nigra; lacrimal gland; vastus lateralis muscle; blood; More reference expression data |
| BioGPS | More reference expression data |
Gene ontology
| Molecular function | DNA binding; RNA polymerase II transcription regulatory region sequence-specific DNA binding; DNA-binding transcription factor activity; chromatin binding; protein binding; DNA-binding transcription repressor activity, RNA polymerase II-specific; double-stranded DNA binding; DNA-binding transcription factor activity, RNA polymerase II-specific; sequence-specific DNA binding |
| Cellular component | PML body; nuclear matrix; nucleoplasm; chromatin; nucleus; nuclear body |
| Biological process | reflex; CD4-positive, alpha-beta T cell differentiation; CD8-positive, alpha-beta T cell differentiation; chromatin remodeling; activated T cell proliferation; regulation of transcription, DNA-templated; negative regulation of transcription by RNA polymerase II; chromatin organization; transcription, DNA-templated; epidermis development; histone methylation; viral process; T cell activation |
Sources:Amigo / QuickGO
Orthologs
| Databases | NCBI: entry; OMA: entry |
| Species | Human | Mouse |
| Entrez | 6304 | 20230 |
| Ensembl | ENSG00000182568 | ENSMUSG00000023927 |
| UniProt | Q01826 | Q60611 |
| RefSeq (mRNA) | NM_001131010; NM_001195470; NM_002971; NM_001322871; NM_001322872 NM_001322873; NM_001322874; NM_001322875; NM_001322876 | NM_001163630; NM_001163631; NM_001163632; NM_009122; NM_001357636 NM_001357637; NM_001357638; NM_001357640 |
| RefSeq (protein) | NP_001124482; NP_001182399; NP_001309800; NP_001309801; NP_001309802 NP_001309803; NP_001309804; NP_001309805; NP_002962 | NP_001157102; NP_001157103; NP_001157104; NP_033148; NP_001344565 NP_001344566; NP_001344567; NP_001344569 |
| Location (UCSC) | Chr 3: 18.35 – 18.45 Mb | Chr 17: 52.04 – 52.14 Mb |
| PubMed search |
- Wikidata
| View/Edit Human | View/Edit Mouse |

SATB1 (special AT-rich sequence-binding protein-1) is a protein which in humans is encoded by the SATB1 gene. It is a dimeric/tetrameric transcription factor with multiple DNA binding domains (CUT1, CUT2 and a Homeobox domain). SATB1 specifically binds to AT-rich DNA sequences with high unwinding propensity called base unpairing regions (BURs), containing matrix attachment regions (MARs).

== Function ==
SATB1 is as a key factor for regulating spatial genome organization and subsequently integrating higher-order chromatin architecture with gene regulation. By binding to MARs and tethering these to the nuclear matrix, SATB1 creates chromatin loops. By changing the chromatin-loop architecture SATB1 is able to change gene transcription. The majority of SATB1 binding sites in the DNA are occupied by CTCF as well, another important chromatin organizer.

=== Immune system ===
SATB1 has a multitude of roles in the development of T cells.

SATB1 plays a role in controlling expression of lineage-specific factors during T cell development, including ThPOK, Runx3, CD4, CD8, and Treg factor Foxp3. SATB1-deficient thymocytes enter inappropriate T lineages and fail to generate the NKT and Treg subsets. The Treg deficiency subsequently causes an auto-immune phenotype in Satb1-deficient mouse models. The auto-immune phenotype is associated with loss of SATB1-dependent spatial rearrangement of the TCRα enhancer and the TCR locus, controlling TCR recombination via downregulation of the Rag1 and Rag2 genes.

Moreover, SATB1 represses IL-2Ralpha and IL-2 expression by recruitment of HDAC1 as part of the NuRD chromatin remodeling complex to a SATB1-bound site in the IL-2Ralpha and IL-2 locus, regulating T cell cytokine expression.

=== Other tissues ===
SATB1 has been described to play a role in a variety of different cellular processes, including epidermal differentiation, brain development, X-chromosome inactivation, and embryonic stem cell differentiation.

== Structure ==
SATB1 contains a ULD, CUTL, CUT1-CUT2 tandem and homeobox domain.

The ULD and CUTL domains at the N-terminal are important for tetramerization and subsequent DNA-binding of SATB1. This N-terminal region can be cleaved off by caspase-6 and caspase-3 during apoptosis, resulting in dissociation from the chromatin.

The CUT1 domain contains a five-helix structure that is crucial for SATB1 binding to MARs with the third helix deeply entering the major groove of the DNA and making direct contacts with the bases. While CUT1 is essential for binding to MAR-sites, the CUT2 domain is dispensable.

The SATB1 homeobox domain confers poor DNA-binding ability by itself, but has been found to increase the DNA-binding affinity and specificity of SATB1 in combination with the CUT domains.

== Clinical significance ==
=== Rare neurodevelopmental disorders ===
Rare high-penetrant heterozygous variants in SATB1 have been identified in neurodevelopmental disorder.

Missense mutations in one of the DNA-binding domains (CUT1 and CUT2) cause a neurodevelopmental syndrome characterized by global developmental delay, moderate to severe intellectual disability, dysmorphic features, teeth abnormalities and early-onset epilepsy (den Hoed-de Boer-Voisin syndrome; DHDBV).

Nonsense and frameshift mutations are associated with a distinct neurodevelopmental condition characterized by mild global developmental delay with variably impaired intellectual development (DEvelopmental delay with dysmorphic Facies and Dental Anomalies; DEFDA).

=== Cancer ===
Higher expression levels of SATB1 have been described to promote tumor growth in breast cancer, glioma, prostate cancer, liver cancer and ovarian cancer, and SATB1 levels have prognostic significance in some of these forms of cancer. Indeed, lowering SATB1 levels have been shown to inhibit proliferation of osteosarcoma and lung adenocarcinoma cells.

In contrast, in CD8+ and CD4 + T cells, Satb1 has been demonstrated to be crucial for anti-tumor immunity by regulating PD-1 expression. T-cells that do not express Satb1 were shown to have less anti-tumor activity, and mice lacking Satb1 expression in CD4+ T cells develop intra-tumoral tertiary lymphoid structures.

== Interactions ==
SATB1 has been shown to interact with:

- BAZ1A,
- CHD4,
- CUTL1,
- HDAC1,
- MTA2,
- POLR2J and
- SMARCA5.
