= SMARCA5 =

Protein-coding gene in the species Homo sapiens

Identifiers
- Aliases: SMARCA5, ISWI, SNF2H, WCRF135, hISWI, hSNF2H, SWI/SNF related, matrix associated, actin dependent regulator of chromatin, subfamily a, member 5
- External IDs: OMIM: 603375; MGI: 1935129; GeneCards: SMARCA5

Gene location (Human)
Chr.	Chromosome 4 (human)
Band	4q31.21	Start	143,513,702 bp
Band	4q31.21	End	143,557,486 bp

Gene location (Mouse)
Chr.	Chromosome 8 (mouse)
Band	8|8 C2	Start	81,425,136 bp
Band	8|8 C2	End	81,466,126 bp
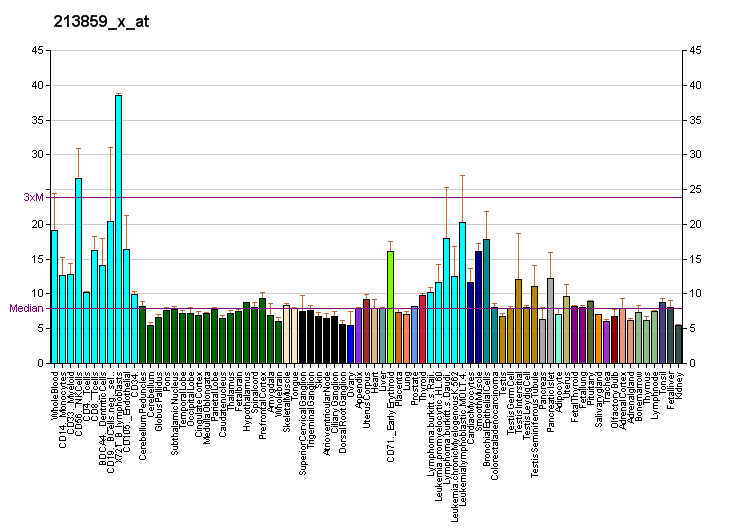

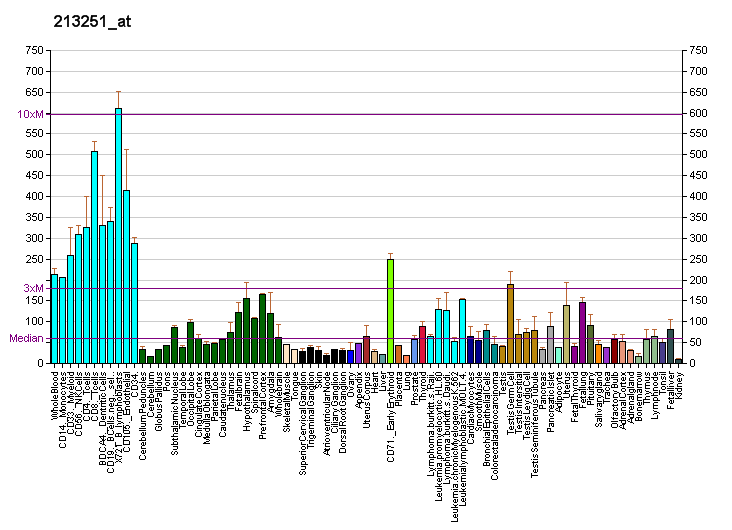

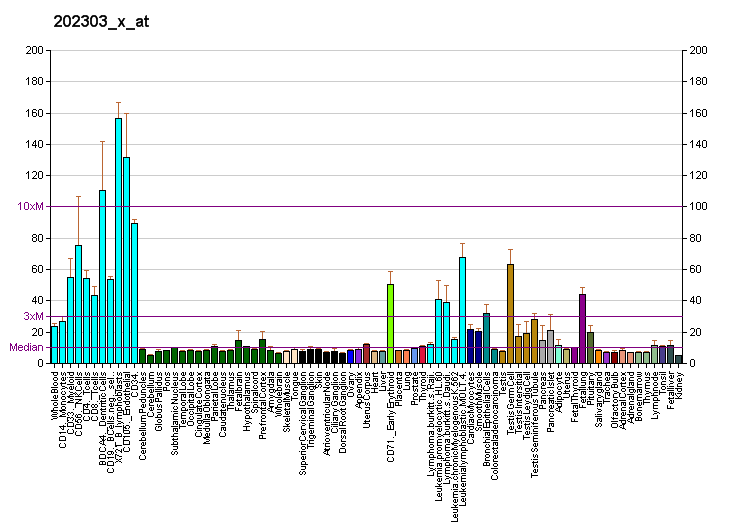
RNA expression pattern
Bgee	Human / Mouse (ortholog); Top expressed in: ventricular zone; Achilles tendon; buccal mucosa cell; ganglionic eminence; Epithelium of choroid plexus; corpus callosum; superior vestibular nucleus; subthalamic nucleus; epithelium of nasopharynx; gonad / Top expressed in: tail of embryo; abdominal wall; Gonadal ridge; mandibular prominence; maxillary prominence; cumulus cell; ventricular zone; epiblast; migratory enteric neural crest cell; superior cervical ganglion; More reference expression data
BioGPS	More reference expression data
Gene ontology
Molecular function	nucleotide binding; helicase activity; histone binding; hydrolase activity, acting on acid anhydrides, in phosphorus-containing anhydrides; protein binding; nucleic acid binding; nucleosome binding; hydrolase activity; DNA binding; ATP binding; ATPase activity; DNA-binding transcription factor activity, RNA polymerase II-specific; ATP-dependent activity, acting on DNA
Cellular component	RSF complex; nuclear replication fork; nucleoplasm; condensed chromosome; nucleus; fibrillar center; NURF complex; chromatin silencing complex; ISWI-type complex
Biological process	epigenetic maintenance of chromatin in transcription-competent conformation; regulation of transcription by RNA polymerase II; CENP-A containing chromatin assembly; DNA-templated transcription, initiation; nucleosome assembly; chromatin remodeling; rDNA heterochromatin assembly; positive regulation of transcription, DNA-templated; cellular response to leukemia inhibitory factor; chromatin organization; positive regulation of transcription by RNA polymerase II
Sources:Amigo / QuickGO
Orthologs
Databases	NCBI: entry; OMA: entry
Species	Human	Mouse
Entrez	8467	93762
Ensembl	ENSG00000153147	ENSMUSG00000031715
UniProt	O60264	Q91ZW3
RefSeq (mRNA)	NM_003601	NM_053124
RefSeq (protein)	NP_003592	NP_444354
Location (UCSC)	Chr 4: 143.51 – 143.56 Mb	Chr 8: 81.43 – 81.47 Mb
PubMed search
- Wikidata
View/Edit Human	View/Edit Mouse

SWI/SNF-related matrix-associated actin-dependent regulator of chromatin subfamily A member 5 is a protein that in humans is encoded by the SMARCA5 gene.

== Function ==
The protein encoded by this gene is a member of the ISWI family of proteins. Members of this family have helicase and ATPase activities and are thought to regulate transcription of certain genes by altering the chromatin structure around those genes. The protein encoded by this gene is a component of the chromatin remodeling and spacing factor RSF, a facilitator of the transcription of class II genes by RNA polymerase II. The encoded protein is similar in sequence to the Drosophila ISWI chromatin remodeling protein.

== Interactions ==
SMARCA5 has been shown to interact with RAD21, Histone deacetylase 2, POLE3, SATB1 and BAZ1A.
