= Robert J. Mislevy =

American psychometrician

Robert J. Mislevy (1950–2025) was an American academic and psychometrician. He is known for his contributions to the field of educational measurement and psychometrics and wrote Sociocognitive Foundations of Educational Measurement. Mislevy led the scholars who shaped the enormously influential Evidence Centered Design (ECD) meta-framework that has informed the development effort of many large scale standardized assessments and gave rise the broader principled assessment design movement.

Mislevy earned a B.S. (1972) and M.S. (1974) in mathematics from Northern Illinois University. He obtained his Ph.D. in Methodology of Behavioral Research at the University of Chicago in 1981.

He worked for the National Opinion Research Center from 1982 before joining Educational Testing Service in 1984. He joined University of Maryland as a Professor of Measurement, Statistics, and Evaluation (EDMS) in 2001. Between 2011 and 2021, he was the Frederic M. Lord Chair in Measurement and Statistics at Educational Testing Service.

He was a past president of the Psychometric Society. He was an elected Fellow of the American Educational Research Association.

Mislevy also was a member of the National Academy of Education, and received awards from the American Educational Research Association in 1988, National Council on Measurement in Education in 2003 and 2019 and the Psychometric Society in 2022.

Mislevy wrote and edited many books in educational measurement and psychometrics including the Bayesian Psychometric Modeling. "Bayesian networks in educational assessment", and "Computational Psychometrics: New Methodologies for a New Generation of Digital Learning and Assessment".

He died on May 22, 2025.
