= POTEB =

Protein-coding gene in the species Homo sapiens

Identifiers
- Aliases: POTEB, A26B1, CT104.5, POTE-15, POTE15, POTE ankyrin domain family member B, POTEB2
- External IDs: OMIM: 608912; GeneCards: POTEB

Gene location (Human)
Chr.	Chromosome 15 (human)
Band	15q11.2	Start	21,846,329 bp
Band	15q11.2	End	21,877,735 bp
RNA expression pattern
Bgee	Human / Mouse (ortholog); Top expressed in: testicle; right testis; left testis; mucosa of transverse colon; placenta; tonsil; right coronary artery; prostate / n/a; More reference expression data
BioGPS	n/a
Orthologs
Databases	NCBI: entry; OMA: entry
Species	Human	Mouse
Entrez	100996331	n/a
Ensembl	ENSG00000233917; ENSG00000288347	n/a
UniProt	H3BUK9	n/a
RefSeq (mRNA)	NM_001277304	n/a
RefSeq (protein)	NP_001264233; NP_001264232; NP_997238.2	n/a
Location (UCSC)	Chr 15: 21.85 – 21.88 Mb	n/a
PubMed search		n/a
- Wikidata
View/Edit Human

POTE ankyrin domain family, member B is a protein in humans that is encoded by the POTEB gene.(Prostate, Ovary, Testes Expressed ankyrin domain family member B). It is most likely involved in mediating protein-protein interaction via its 5 ankyrin domains. POTEB is most probably aids in intracellular signaling, but is not likely to be a secreted or nuclear protein. POTEB's function is likely to be regulated via 17 potential phosphorylation sites. There is currently no evidence to suggest that POTEB has nuclear localization signals.

== Gene ==
POTEB is located at 15q11.2 on chromosome 15 in humans and is transcribed from the reverse DNA strand. POTEB is also known as POTEB3 and POTE15. The POTEB gene is 47,547 base pairs in length and is composed of 11 exons.

Schematic diagram of chromosome 15 in humans, showing the location of the POTEB gene (Red line).

== mRNA ==
The POTEB gene can be transcribed to create four potential mRNAs. However, only one of these mRNAs, possessing all 11 exons, is capable of being translated to the POTEB protein. The three other transcripts do not encode proteins.

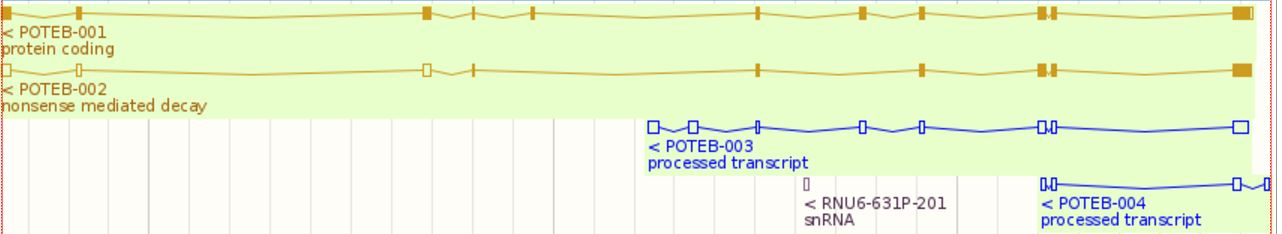
The 4 possible mRNAs obtained from the POTEB gene. Only POTEB-001, containing 11 exons, encodes the complete POTEB protein.

== Protein ==
The POTEB protein is composed of 544 amino acids and, according to bioinformatic analyses, has a molecular weight of 61.7 kDa. It has an isoelectric point of 5.68. Its most common amino acids are leucine and glutamic acid, which account for 11% and 10.3% of the protein respectively. However, this is normal for human proteins. POTEB is most likely a cytoplasmic protein that is phosphorylated at 17 serines, threonines, and tyrosines located throughout the length of the protein, but concentrated at the C-terminus of the protein. Its secondary structure is mainly five helical ankyrin repeat domains, which contain the TALHL motif. There is also one myristoylation site on the protein, close to the N-terminus.

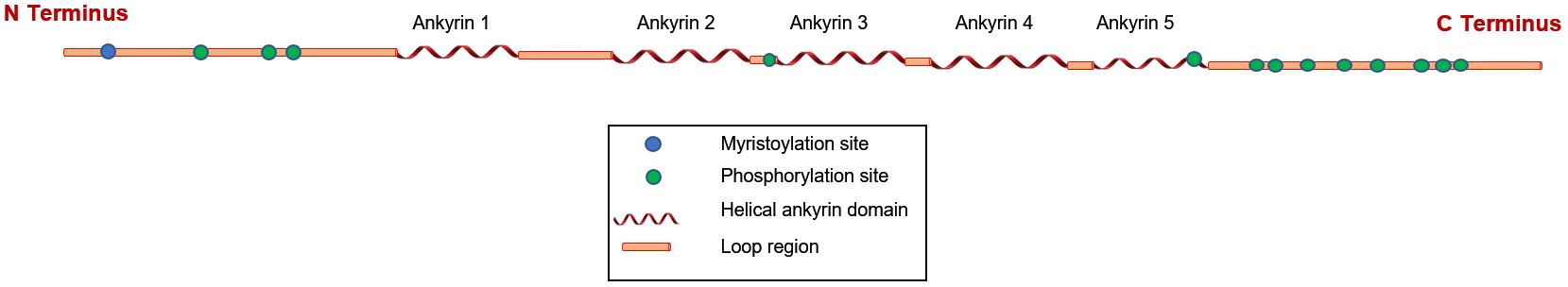
A schematic diagram showing important domains and post-translational modifications of POTEB.

== Expression ==
POTEB is expressed at high levels in the human prostate, ovary, and testes. However, there is also evidence to show that it is expressed at low levels in embryonic stem cells, the nasopharyngeal region, and in breast tissue. In embryonic stem cells, differentiation is likely to turn off the expression of POTEB while in breast cancer, triple negative cells are found to have no POTEB expression suggesting a role in cancer-activated pathways.

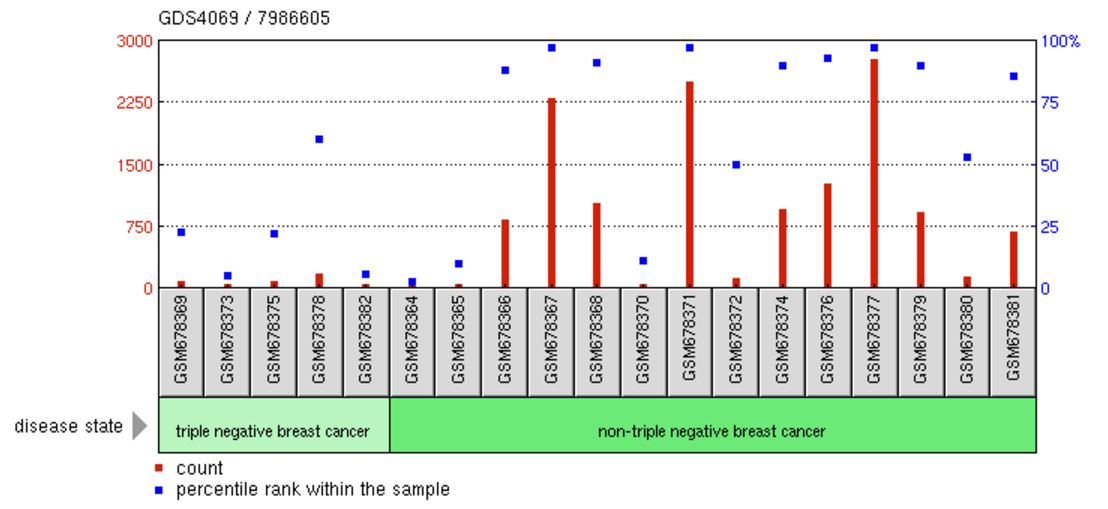
This graph compares POTEB expression in different types of breast cancer tissue.

Some studies have used POTEB probes to study the expression of POTEB in the human brain. However, the only region with notable POTEB expression is the cerebellar cortex, responsible for motor function and some cognitive functions.

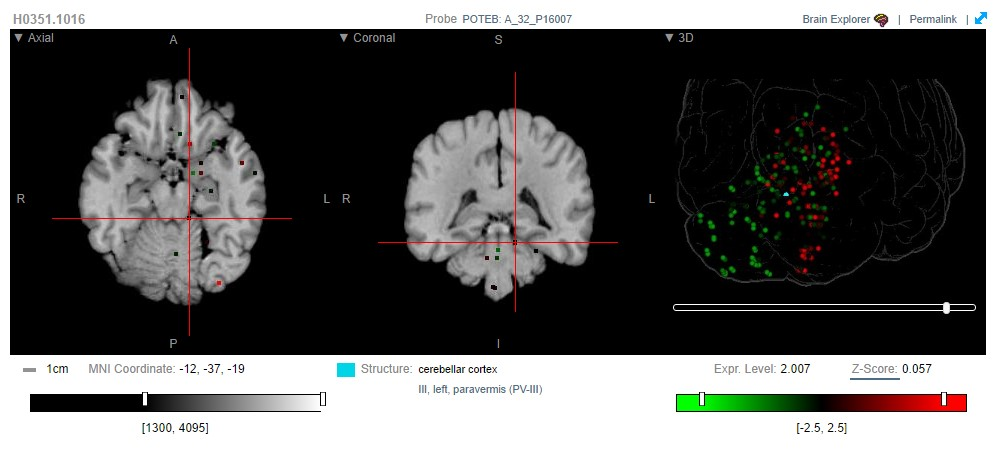
This image shows the expression of POTEB in the human brain, around the cerebellar cortex region.

== Regulation of Expression ==
POTEB expression is likely regulated by E-box binding factors and Krueppel-like transcription factors, along with nuclear factor kappa B (NF-κB) transcription factors.

POTEB expression could be regulated by the binding of transcription factors to intron 1 of the pre-mRNA, leading to the production of a truncated mRNA which is not translated. Alternatively, POTEB expression could be downregulated by the formation of stem loops close to the start codon. There are no known ubiquitination sites in POTEB that could aid in regulating POTEB function and stability.

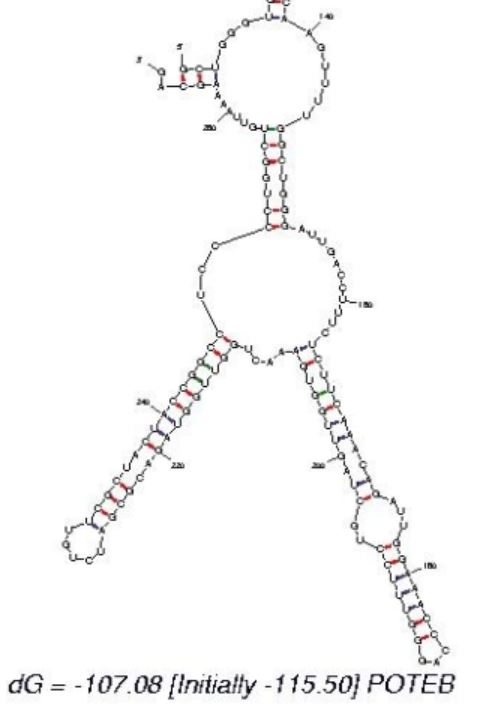
This image shows one of the predicted stem loop structures in POTEB mRNA. Structures such as these could influence whether or not ribosomes have access to the POTEB mRNA sequence, in turn affecting expression of POTEB protein.

== Function ==
POTEB is most likely involved in mediating protein-protein interaction via its 5 ankyrin domains. POTEB is most probably aids in intracellular signaling, but is not likely to be a secreted or nuclear protein as it is unlikely to contain nuclear localization signals. POTEB's function is likely to be regulated via 17 potential phosphorylation sites which determine how the ankyrin domains interact with other proteins.

=== Protein-Protein Interactions ===
There have been no studies published confirming the interaction of POTEB with other human proteins. However, there is unpublished data suggesting an interaction between POTEB and alpha-1-B glycoproteins, APOBEC1 complementation factors, and alpha-2-macroglobulin. This data is based on affinity capture- mass spectrometry.

== Clinical Significance ==
POTEB expression is low or completely reduced in triple-negative breast cancer cells when compared to other types of breast cancer cells. This suggests POTEB’s involvement in intracellular signaling pathways that suppress cancer, or in pathways that regulate the normal growth and division of cells.

== Homology ==
=== Paralogs ===
POTEB has 8 predicted paralogs (According to protein sequence) in humans, with most paralogs being located on different human chromosomes. It is speculated that this large number of paralogs arose from multiple duplication events.

Paralog name	Accession number	% Identity	Amino acids	Chromosome #
POTE 15B	AAS58869.1	99	544	Chromosome 15
POTE C	NP_001131143.1	90	542	Chromosome 18
POTE H	NP_001129685.1	89	545	Chromosome 22
POTE J	NP_001264012.1	86	1038	Chromosome 2
POTE 14A	AAS58868.1	82	508	Chromosome 14
POTE G	NP_001005356.1	82	508	Chromosome 14
POTE E	XP_016859648.1	80	967	Chromosome 2
POTE I	NP_001264335.1	80	1075	Chromosome 2

=== Orthologs ===
POTEB orthologs have been found in mammals, birds, reptiles, amphibians, fish, and even in invertebrates such as sea anemones and marine polychaete worms. These orthologs share a similarity with POTEB largely due to the presence of ankyrin repeats, suggesting that ankyrin domain-containing proteins have been conserved over millions of years. POTEB orthologs have not been found in plants, unicellular eukaryotes, bacteria and archaea.

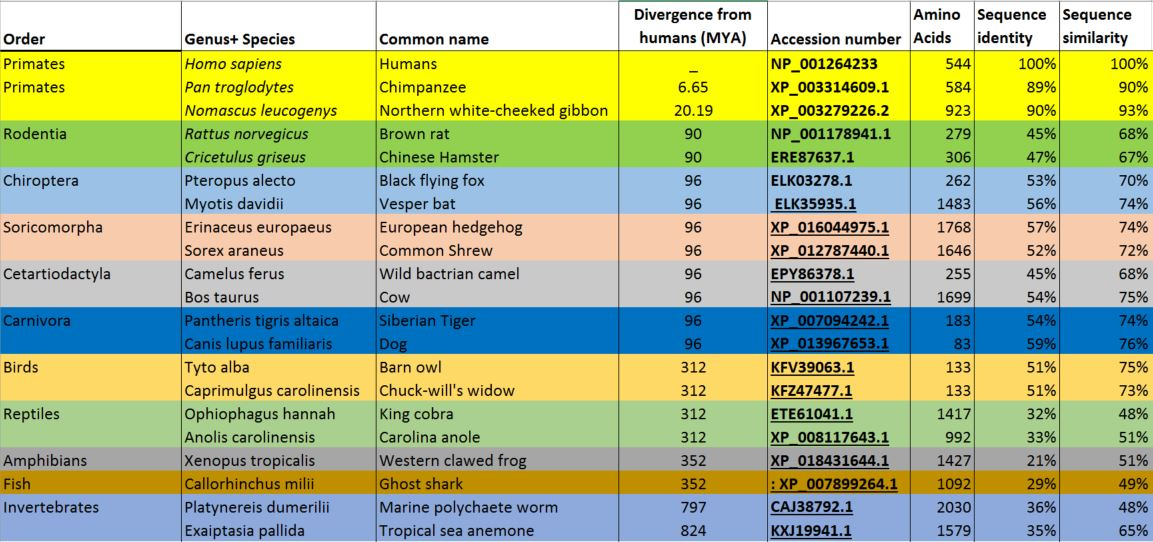
POTEB orthologs in different organisms, found using NCBI BLAST searches. POTEB orthologs were not found in plants, unicellular eukaryotes, archaea, and bacteria. Time since divergence was obtained using Timetree.
