= Chromatin structure remodeling (RSC) complex =

ATP-dependent chromatin-remodeling protein complex in yeast

RSC (Remodeling the Structure of Chromatin) is a protein complex of the ATP-dependent chromatin remodeler family. The activity of the RSC complex allows for chromatin to be remodeled by altering the structure of the nucleosome.

There are four subfamilies of chromatin remodelers: SWI/SNF, INO80, ISW1, and CHD. The RSC complex is a 15-subunit protein complex first discovered in Saccharomyces cerevisiae in 1996, and is homologous to the SWI/SNF complex found in humans. The RSC complex has ATPase activity in the presence of DNA.

== RSC vs. SWI/SNF ==
While RSC and SWI/SNF have similar structures and functions, RSC is significantly more common than the SWI/SNF complex in yeast, and RSC is required for mitotic cell division. Absence of the RSC complex is lethal; without it, cells cannot survive. RSC consists of a complex of 15 protein subunits, and at least three of these subunits are conserved between RSC and SWI/SNF. RSC and SWI/SNF are composed of very similar components, such as the Sth1 components in RSC and the SWI2/Snf2p in SWI/SNF. Both of these components are ATPases that consist of Arp7 and Arp9, proteins similar to actin. The subunits of Sth1 (Rsc6p, Rsc8p, and Sfh1p) are paralogues to the three subunits of SWI/SNF (Swp73p, Swi3p, and Snf5p). While there are many similarities between these two chromatin remodeling complexes, they remodel different parts of chromatin. They also have opposing roles, specifically when interacting with the PHO8 promoter. RSC works to guarantee the placement of nucleosome N-3, while SWI/SNF attempts to override the placement of N-3.

RSC and SWI/SNF complexes both function as chromatin remodeling complexes in humans (Homo sapiens) and the common fruit fly (Drosophila melanogaster). SWI/SNF was first discovered when a genetic screen was done in yeast with a mutation causing a deficiency in mating-type switching (swi) and a mutation causing a deficiency in sucrose fermentation. After this chromatin remodeling complex was discovered, the RSC complex was found when its components, Snf2 and Swi2p, were discovered to be homologous to the SWI/SNF complex.

BLAST homology alignment of reference genomes has revealed that the yeast RSC complex is even more similar to the human SWI/SNF complex than it is to yeast's own SWI/SNF complex.

== The role of RSC ==
The role of nucleosomes is a very important topic of study in modern epigenetics research. It is known that nucleosomes interfere with the binding of transcription factors to DNA, therefore allowing them some form of subtle control over the probability of transcription and replication occurring at a given locus. With the help of an in vitro experiment using yeast, it was discovered that RSC is required for nucleosome remodeling. There is evidence that RSC does not remodel the nucleosomes on its own; it uses information from enzymes to help position nucleosomes.

The ATPase activity of the RSC complex is activated by single-stranded, double-stranded, and/or nucleosomal DNA, while some of the other chromatin remodeling complexes are only stimulated by one of these DNA-types.

The RSC complex (specifically Rsc8 and Rsc30) is crucial when fixing double-stranded breaks via non-homologous end joining (NHEJ) in yeast. This repair mechanism is important for cell survival as well as for maintaining an organism's genome. These double-stranded breaks are typically caused by radiation, and they can be detrimental to the genome. The breaks can lead to mutations that reposition a chromosome and can even lead to the entire loss of a chromosome. The mutations associated with double-stranded breaks have been linked to cancer and other deadly genetic diseases. RSC not only repairs double-stranded breaks by NHEJ, it also repairs these breaks using homologous recombination with the help of the SWI/SNF complex. SWI/SNF is recruited first, prior to two homologous chromosomes bind, and then RSC is recruited to help complete the repair.

== Mechanism of action in dsDNA ==
A single-molecule study using magnetic tweezers and linear DNA observed that RSC generates DNA loops in vitro while simultaneously generating negative supercoils in the template. These loops can consist of hundreds of base pairs, but the length depends on how tightly the DNA is wound, as well as how much ATP is present during this translocation. Not only could RSC generate loops, but it was also able to relax these loops, meaning that the translocation of RSC is reversible.

Hydrolysis of ATP allows the complex to translocate the DNA into a loop. RSC can release the loop either by translocating back to the original state at a comparable velocity, or by losing one of its two contacts.

== RSC components ==
The following is a list of RSC components that have been identified in yeast, their corresponding human orthologs, and their functions:

Yeast	Human	Function
RSC1	BAF180	DNA repair mechanisms, tumor suppressor protein
RSC2	BAF180	DNA repair mechanisms, tumor suppressor protein
RSC4	BAF180	DNA repair mechanisms, tumor suppressor protein
RSC6	BAF60a	Mitotic growth
RSC8	BAF170, BAF155	Regulates cortical size/thickness, tumor suppressor

== See also ==
- SWI/SNF (nucleosome remodeling complex)
- Mi-2/NuRD complex
- INO80B (gene)
- Imitation SWI (nucleosome remodeling complex)
