= ZNF837 =

Identifiers
- Aliases: ZNF837, zinc finger protein 837
- External IDs: GeneCards: ZNF837

Gene location (Human)
Chr.	Chromosome 19 (human)
Band	19q13.43	Start	58,367,618 bp
Band	19q13.43	End	58,381,030 bp
RNA expression pattern
Bgee	Human / Mouse (ortholog); Top expressed in: right uterine tube; right lobe of liver; left lobe of thyroid gland; right lobe of thyroid gland; stromal cell of endometrium; left ovary; right ovary; right adrenal gland; right adrenal cortex; left adrenal gland / n/a; More reference expression data
BioGPS	n/a
Gene ontology
Molecular function	DNA binding; metal ion binding; nucleic acid binding; DNA-binding transcription factor activity, RNA polymerase II-specific
Cellular component	nucleus
Biological process	transcription, DNA-templated; regulation of transcription, DNA-templated; regulation of transcription by RNA polymerase II
Sources:Amigo / QuickGO
Orthologs
Databases	NCBI: entry; OMA: entry
Species	Human	Mouse
Entrez	116412	n/a
Ensembl	ENSG00000152475	n/a
UniProt	Q96EG3	n/a
RefSeq (mRNA)	NM_001129730; NM_138466	n/a
RefSeq (protein)	NP_612475	n/a
Location (UCSC)	Chr 19: 58.37 – 58.38 Mb	n/a
PubMed search		n/a
- Wikidata
View/Edit Human

ZNF837 is a protein that in humans is encoded by the ZNF837 gene, is located at 19q13.431 with minus strand orientation. ZNF837 protein is characterized as a Cys_{2}His_{2}-type zinc finger protein.

== Homology and Evolution ==
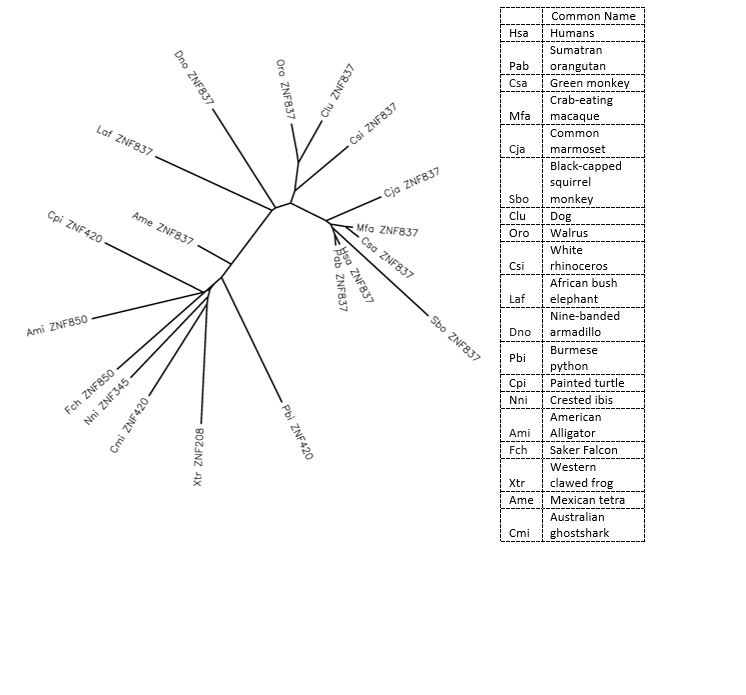
Unrooted phylogenetic tree based on an alignment of the protein sequence of ZNF837 homologs.

The human ZNF837 has homologs present in many mammals and seen more distantly. All homologs are chordates. All contain both COG5048 and Zf-Cys_{2}His_{2}_2 domains. The areas that these domains are found contain the highest conservation rates. In humans, 5 Zf-H2C2 double domains and 2 COG5048 domains are present.

The protein sequence is fast evolving among these homologs.

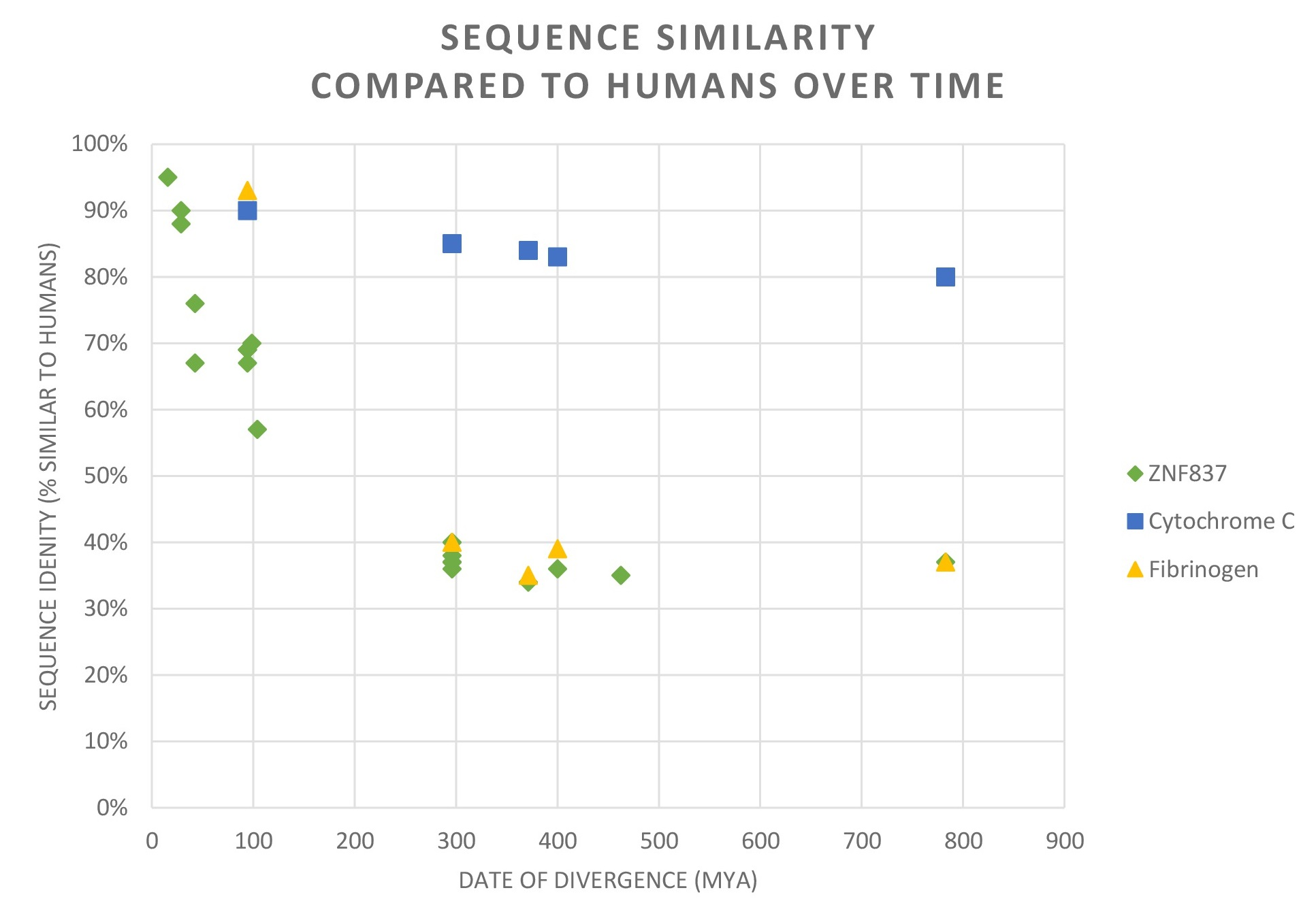
ZNF837 homologs percent similarity to the human protein graphed against the date that it diverged from Homo sapiens. Also graphed is the Cytochrome C, a slow evolving protein, and Fibrinogen, a fast evolving protein, to determine the speed of the ZNF837 protein's evolution

ZNF837 has numerous paralogs in humans, all of which are zinc finger proteins.

== Human ZNF837 ==
In humans, there are no other aliases, and its neighboring genes are MIR4754, A1BG, and RPS5. ZNF837 mRNA that is made into function protein contains 1921 nucleotides, of which 222-1817 are translated to a protein containing 3 exons. The protein consists of 531 amino acids with a weight of 58,078 Da with an isoelectric point at 9.525.

=== Gene Variants ===
There are 2 transcript variants. Transcript variant 1, 2050 base pairs in length, is non-coding due to a nonsense-mediated mRNA decay . Transcript variant 2 is made into the functional protein due to an alternate splice site.

=== Post Translational ===
It is predicted via high conservation to have 4 phosphorylation sites at T386, T455, S460, Y503. The internal structure is includes combination of alpha helices, beta sheets and mainly random coils.

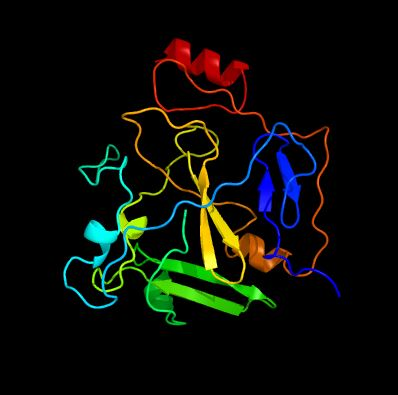
Structure of part of ZNF837 as predicted by Phyre2. The structure matches with 99.9% confidence to 37% of the sequence.

=== Expression ===
ZNF837 has observed in the pancreas, liver, uterus, and muscle cells. In all cases concentration is low. However, the expression of ZNF837 is seen to have the most impact is when looking at normal vs diseased state. There is a consistent change that is able to be seen.
