= RSF1 =

Protein-coding gene in the species Homo sapiens

Identifiers
- Aliases: RSF1, HBXAP, RSF-1, XAP8, p325, remodeling and spacing factor 1
- External IDs: OMIM: 608522; MGI: 2682305; GeneCards: RSF1

Gene location (Human)
Chr.	Chromosome 11 (human)
Band	11q14.1	Start	77,660,009 bp
Band	11q14.1	End	77,820,869 bp

Gene location (Mouse)
Chr.	Chromosome 7 (mouse)
Band	7|7 E1	Start	97,229,096 bp
Band	7|7 E1	End	97,341,985 bp
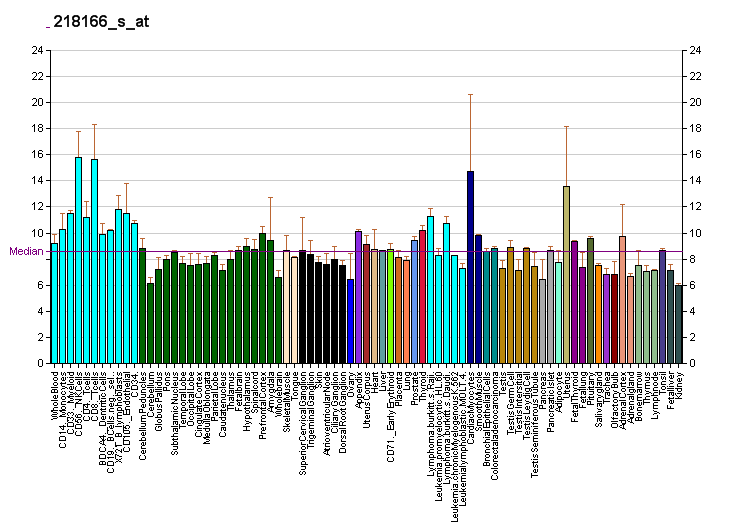
RNA expression pattern
Bgee	Human / Mouse (ortholog); Top expressed in: Achilles tendon; internal globus pallidus; sural nerve; epithelium of colon; tendon of biceps brachii; cerebellar vermis; Brodmann area 23; pars reticulata; middle temporal gyrus; external globus pallidus / Top expressed in: hand; Rostral migratory stream; tail of embryo; genital tubercle; ventromedial nucleus; lateral septal nucleus; otolith organ; olfactory tubercle; utricle; maxillary prominence; More reference expression data
BioGPS	More reference expression data
Gene ontology
Molecular function	histone binding; ATPase activity; protein binding; metal ion binding; histone acetyltransferase activity
Cellular component	RSF complex; nucleus; nucleoplasm; histone acetyltransferase complex
Biological process	positive regulation of transcription, DNA-templated; negative regulation of DNA binding; chromatin remodeling; positive regulation of viral transcription; negative regulation of transcription, DNA-templated; regulation of transcription, DNA-templated; CENP-A containing chromatin assembly; transcription, DNA-templated; DNA-templated transcription, initiation; nucleosome assembly; chromatin organization; histone acetylation; positive regulation of transcription by RNA polymerase II
Sources:Amigo / QuickGO
Orthologs
Databases	NCBI: entry; OMA: entry
Species	Human	Mouse
Entrez	51773	233532
Ensembl	ENSG00000048649	ENSMUSG00000035623
UniProt	Q96T23; Q05DG0	n/a
RefSeq (mRNA)	NM_016578	NM_001081267
RefSeq (protein)	NP_057662; NP_057662.3	n/a
Location (UCSC)	Chr 11: 77.66 – 77.82 Mb	Chr 7: 97.23 – 97.34 Mb
PubMed search
- Wikidata
View/Edit Human	View/Edit Mouse

Remodeling and spacing factor 1 is a protein that in humans is encoded by the RSF1 gene.

HBXAP is involved in transcription repression, transcription coactivation when associated with hepatitis B virus X protein (HBX), and chromatin remodeling and spacing when associated with SNF2H (MIM 603375).[supplied by OMIM]
