= PIK3IP1 =

Protein-coding gene in the species Homo sapiens

Identifiers
- Aliases: PIK3IP1, HGFL, hHGFL(S), phosphoinositide-3-kinase interacting protein 1, TrIP
- External IDs: MGI: 1917016; GeneCards: PIK3IP1

Gene location (Human)
Chr.	Chromosome 22 (human)
Band	22q12.2	Start	31,281,594 bp
Band	22q12.2	End	31,292,534 bp
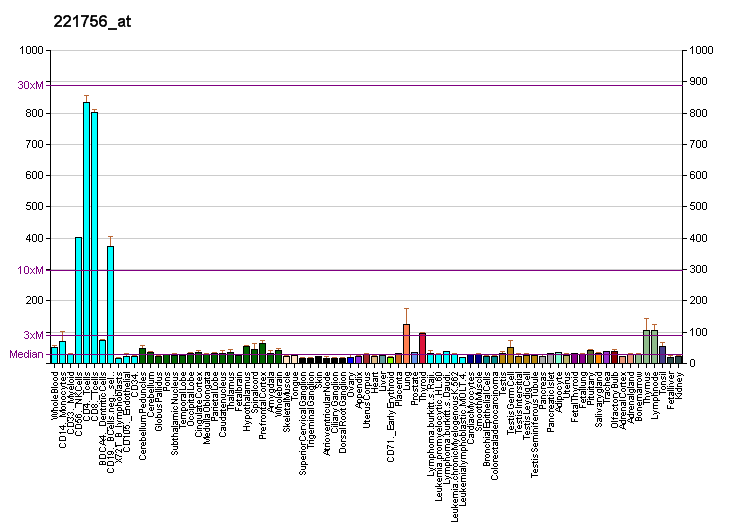

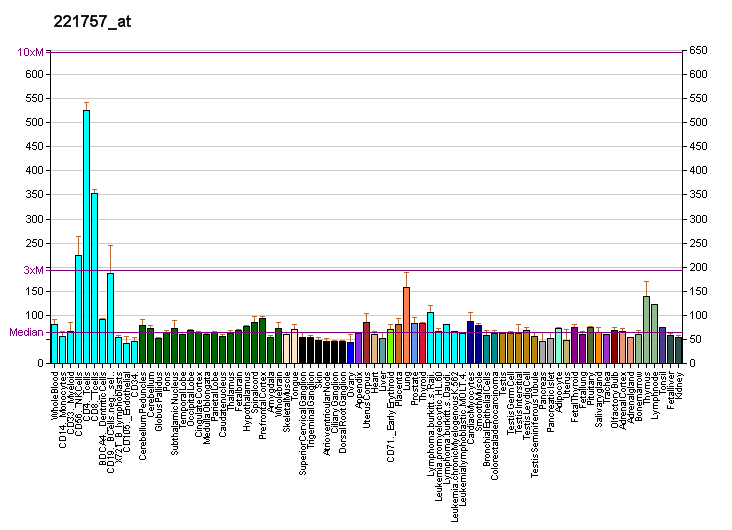
RNA expression pattern
Bgee	Human / Mouse (ortholog); Top expressed in: lymph node; olfactory zone of nasal mucosa; right lung; granulocyte; blood; gastric mucosa; spleen; tibial nerve; skin of leg; skin of abdomen / n/a; More reference expression data
BioGPS	More reference expression data
Gene ontology
Molecular function	phosphatidylinositol 3-kinase catalytic subunit binding; protein binding
Cellular component	integral component of membrane; plasma membrane; membrane
Biological process	negative regulation of phosphatidylinositol 3-kinase signaling; negative regulation of phosphatidylinositol 3-kinase activity
Sources:Amigo / QuickGO
Orthologs
Databases	NCBI: entry; OMA: entry
Species	Human	Mouse
Entrez	113791	216505
Ensembl	ENSG00000100100	n/a
UniProt	Q96FE7	Q7TMJ8
RefSeq (mRNA)	NM_052880; NM_001135911	NM_178149
RefSeq (protein)	NP_001129383; NP_443112	NP_835362
Location (UCSC)	Chr 22: 31.28 – 31.29 Mb	n/a
PubMed search
- Wikidata
View/Edit Human	View/Edit Mouse

Phosphoinositide-3-kinase-interacting protein 1 (PIK3IP1) is an enzyme that in humans is encoded by the PIK3IP1 gene.

PIK3IP1 is a transmembrane protein that binds to PI3K, reducing signal to the PI3K/AKT/mTOR pathway. Through this mechanism, PIK3IP1 inhibits cell proliferation in tumor cells and is associated with cancer. PIK3IP1 is also associated with the inflammatory response and autoimmune diseases.
