= Evidence-centered design =

Evidence Centered Design is a meta-framework for the design of assessments, and much of the development and administration of them, as well. The development and popularization of Evidence Centered Design within the larger field of assessment has been led by Robert J. Mislevy and his major co-authors.

Evidence Centered Design is the most prominent of the prominent Principled Assessment Design approach and is the model upon which many others have been built, including Huff, Nichols & Schneider particular version of Principled Assessment Design and Rigorous Test Development.

== Layers ==
The meta-framework of Evidence Centered Design has five layers.

- Domain Analysis
- Domain Modelling
- Conceptual Assessment Framework
- Assessment Implementation
- Assessment Administration

== Assessment ==
- Advanced Placement Exams
- GED Test
- Dynamic Learning Maps System
