= CEP76 =

Protein-coding gene in the species Homo sapiens

Identifiers
- Aliases: CEP76, C18orf9, HsT1705, centrosomal protein 76
- External IDs: MGI: 1923401; HomoloGene: 11774; GeneCards: CEP76; OMA:CEP76 - orthologs

Gene location (Human)
Chr.	Chromosome 18 (human)
Band	18p11.21	Start	12,661,833 bp
Band	18p11.21	End	12,702,777 bp

Gene location (Mouse)
Chr.	Chromosome 18 (mouse)
Band	18|18 E1	Start	67,750,870 bp
Band	18|18 E1	End	67,774,406 bp
RNA expression pattern
Bgee	Human / Mouse (ortholog); Top expressed in: secondary oocyte; sperm; gonad; testicle; left testis; right testis; oral cavity; gingival epithelium; ventricular zone; ganglionic eminence / Top expressed in: spermatocyte; spermatid; hand; cerebellum; human fetus; otic vesicle; Paneth cell; cerebellar cortex; secondary oocyte; zygote; More reference expression data
BioGPS	n/a
Gene ontology
Molecular function	protein binding
Cellular component	cytoplasm; microtubule organizing center; centriole; cytosol; centrosome; cytoskeleton; protein-containing complex
Biological process	regulation of centriole replication; G2/M transition of mitotic cell cycle; ciliary basal body-plasma membrane docking; regulation of G2/M transition of mitotic cell cycle
Sources:Amigo / QuickGO
Orthologs
Species	Human	Mouse
Entrez	79959	225659
Ensembl	ENSG00000101624	ENSMUSG00000073542
UniProt	Q8TAP6	Q0VEJ0
RefSeq (mRNA)	NM_001271989; NM_024899	NM_001081073; NM_001357523
RefSeq (protein)	NP_001258918; NP_079175	NP_001074542; NP_001344452
Location (UCSC)	Chr 18: 12.66 – 12.7 Mb	Chr 18: 67.75 – 67.77 Mb
PubMed search
- Wikidata
View/Edit Human	View/Edit Mouse

Centrosomal protein of 76 kDa, also known as CEP76, is a protein that in humans is encoded by the CEP76 gene.
