= Expanded criteria donor =

Class of organ donors

Expanded Criteria Donor (ECD) is normally associated with kidney donors. They are also referred to as donors with "medical complexities". ECD donors are normally aged 60 years or older, or over 50 years with at least two of the following conditions: hypertension history, serum creatinine > 1.5 mg/dl or cause of death from cerebrovascular accident.

Of the 9319 living kidney donations reported in the American Organ Procurement and Transplantation Network (OPTN) / United Network for Organ Sharing (UNOS) database from July 2004 to December 2005, 368 (4.0%) donors were over the age of 60 (of which 86 [0.9%] were over the age of 65), 956 (10.3%) had hypertension, 2785 (29.9%) had an eGFR < 80 mL/min per 1.73 m2 (of which 392 [4.2%] had an eGFR < 60 mL/min per 1.73 m2) and 1194 (12.8%) had a BMI > 30 kg/m2 (of which 250 [2.7%] had a BMI > 35 kg/m2)

The concept of ECD was raised to address the discrepancy between demand and supply in kidney transplantation.
