= RAB30 =

Protein-coding gene in the species Homo sapiens

Identifiers
- Aliases: RAB30, member RAS oncogene family
- External IDs: OMIM: 605693; MGI: 1923235; GeneCards: RAB30
Available structures
| PDB | Ortholog search: PDBe RCSB |
| PDB | List of PDB id codes 2EW1 |
Enzyme activity
| EC # | BRENDA | ExPASy | KEGG | MetaCyc |
|---|---|---|---|---|
| 3.6.5.2 | ↗ | ↗ | ↗ | ↗ |

Gene location (Human)
| Chr. | Chromosome 11 (human) |
| Band | 11q14.1 | Start | 82,973,133 bp |
| Band | 11q14.1 | End | 83,071,923 bp |

Gene location (Mouse)
| Chr. | Chromosome 7 (mouse) |
| Band | 7|7 E1 | Start | 92,390,811 bp |
| Band | 7|7 E1 | End | 92,493,743 bp |
RNA expression pattern
| Bgee | Human / Mouse (ortholog); Top expressed in: internal globus pallidus; corpus callosum; secondary oocyte; external globus pallidus; pars reticulata; pars compacta; Brodmann area 23; inferior ganglion of vagus nerve; endothelial cell; superior vestibular nucleus / Top expressed in: epithelium of small intestine; yolk sac; trigeminal ganglion; lobe of cerebellum; cerebellar vermis; pontine nuclei; facial motor nucleus; lateral geniculate nucleus; medial vestibular nucleus; deep cerebellar nuclei; More reference expression data |
| BioGPS | n/a |
Gene ontology
| Molecular function | nucleotide binding; GTP binding; GTPase activity |
| Cellular component | cis-Golgi network; Golgi apparatus; trans-Golgi network; Golgi stack; membrane; Golgi cisterna; Golgi membrane; cytoplasm; intracellular membrane-bounded organelle; endoplasmic reticulum membrane |
| Biological process | Golgi organization; intracellular protein transport; endoplasmic reticulum to Golgi vesicle-mediated transport; Rab protein signal transduction; small GTPase mediated signal transduction |
Sources:Amigo / QuickGO
Orthologs
| Databases | NCBI: entry; OMA: entry |
| Species | Human | Mouse |
| Entrez | 27314 | 75985 |
| Ensembl | ENSG00000137502 | ENSMUSG00000030643 |
| UniProt | Q15771 | Q923S9 |
| RefSeq (mRNA) | NM_014488; NM_001286059; NM_001286060; NM_001286061 | NM_029494 |
| RefSeq (protein) | NP_001272988; NP_001272989; NP_001272990; NP_055303; NP_001272988.1 NP_001272989.1; NP_001272990.1; NP_055303.2 | NP_083770 |
| Location (UCSC) | Chr 11: 82.97 – 83.07 Mb | Chr 7: 92.39 – 92.49 Mb |
| PubMed search |
- Wikidata
| View/Edit Human | View/Edit Mouse |

RAB30, member RAS oncogene family is a protein that in humans is encoded by the RAB30 gene.
