= Chromatin accessibility complex 1 =

Protein found in humans

CHRAC1

Identifiers
- Aliases: CHRAC1, CHARC1, CHARC15, CHRAC-1, CHRAC-15, CHRAC15, YCL1, chromatin accessibility complex 1, chromatin accessibility complex subunit 1
- External IDs: OMIM: 607268; MGI: 2135796; GeneCards: CHRAC1

Gene location (Human)
Chr.	Chromosome 8 (human)
Band	8q24.3	Start	140,511,311 bp
Band	8q24.3	End	140,517,154 bp

Gene location (Mouse)
Chr.	Chromosome 15 (mouse)
Band	15|15 D3	Start	72,962,241 bp
Band	15|15 D3	End	72,969,403 bp
RNA expression pattern
Bgee	Human / Mouse (ortholog); Top expressed in: pancreatic epithelial cell; monocyte; tibial arteries; muscle of leg; gastrocnemius muscle; muscle of thigh; tibialis anterior muscle; smooth muscle tissue; mucosa of ileum; right coronary artery / Top expressed in: saccule; otic placode; seminiferous tubule; spermatocyte; otic vesicle; spermatid; fossa; condyle; muscle of thigh; intercostal muscle; More reference expression data
BioGPS	n/a
Gene ontology
Molecular function	transferase activity; DNA binding; DNA-directed DNA polymerase activity; nucleotidyltransferase activity; protein binding; protein heterodimerization activity
Cellular component	epsilon DNA polymerase complex; nucleus; CHRAC
Biological process	DNA biosynthetic process; chromatin remodeling
Sources:Amigo / QuickGO
Orthologs
Databases	NCBI: entry; OMA: entry
Species	Human	Mouse
Entrez	54108	93696
Ensembl	ENSG00000104472	ENSMUSG00000068391
UniProt	Q9NRG0	Q9JKP8
RefSeq (mRNA)	NM_017444	NM_053068
RefSeq (protein)	NP_059140	NP_444298
Location (UCSC)	Chr 8: 140.51 – 140.52 Mb	Chr 15: 72.96 – 72.97 Mb
PubMed search
- Wikidata
View/Edit Human	View/Edit Mouse

Chromatin accessibility complex 1 is a protein that in humans is encoded by the CHRAC1 gene.

== Function ==
CHRAC1 is a histone-fold protein that interacts with other histone-fold proteins to bind DNA in a sequence-independent manner. These histone-fold protein dimers combine within larger enzymatic complexes for DNA transcription, replication, and packaging.
