= Alpha-1-B glycoprotein =

Protein-coding gene in the species Homo sapiens

A1BG

Identifiers
- Aliases: A1BG, A1B, ABG, GAB, HYST2477, alpha-1-B glycoprotein
- External IDs: OMIM: 138670; MGI: 2152878; GeneCards: A1BG

Gene location (Human)
Chr.	Chromosome 19 (human)
Band	19q13.43	Start	58,345,178 bp
Band	19q13.43	End	58,353,492 bp

Gene location (Mouse)
Chr.	Chromosome 15 (mouse)
Band	15|15 D1	Start	60,768,708 bp
Band	15|15 D1	End	60,794,861 bp
RNA expression pattern
Bgee	Human / Mouse (ortholog); Top expressed in: right lobe of liver; anterior pituitary; C1 segment; canal of the cervix; right coronary artery; putamen; nucleus accumbens; amygdala; right auricle of heart; hippocampus proper / Top expressed in: primary oocyte; zygote; secondary oocyte; neural layer of retina; muscle of thigh; spermatid; quadriceps femoris muscle; skeletal muscle tissue; hypothalamus; blastocyst; More reference expression data
BioGPS	n/a
Gene ontology
Molecular function	molecular function
Cellular component	blood microparticle; extracellular exosome; extracellular region; platelet alpha granule lumen; extracellular space; secretory granule lumen; ficolin-1-rich granule lumen; extracellular matrix; collagen-containing extracellular matrix
Biological process	platelet degranulation; neutrophil degranulation; biological process
Sources:Amigo / QuickGO
Orthologs
Databases	NCBI: entry; OMA: entry
Species	Human	Mouse
Entrez	1	117586
Ensembl	ENSG00000121410	ENSMUSG00000022347
UniProt	P04217	Q19LI2
RefSeq (mRNA)	NM_130786	NM_001081067
RefSeq (protein)	NP_570602	NP_001074536
Location (UCSC)	Chr 19: 58.35 – 58.35 Mb	Chr 15: 60.77 – 60.79 Mb
PubMed search
- Wikidata
View/Edit Human	View/Edit Mouse

Alpha-1-B glycoprotein is a 54.3 kDa protein in humans that is encoded by the A1BG gene. The protein encoded by this gene is a plasma glycoprotein of unknown function. The protein shows sequence similarity to the variable regions of some immunoglobulin supergene family member proteins. Patients who have pancreatic ductal adenocarcinoma show an overexpression of A1BG in pancreatic juice.

== Gene ==
=== Neighborhood ===
A1BG is located on the negative DNA strand of chromosome 19 from 58,858,172 – 58,864,865. Additionally, A1BG is located directly adjacent to the ZSCAN22 gene (58,838,385-58,853,712) on the positive DNA strand, as well as the ZNF837 (58,878,990 - 58,892,389, complement) and ZNF497 (58865723 - 58,874,214, complement) genes on the negative strand.

=== Expression ===
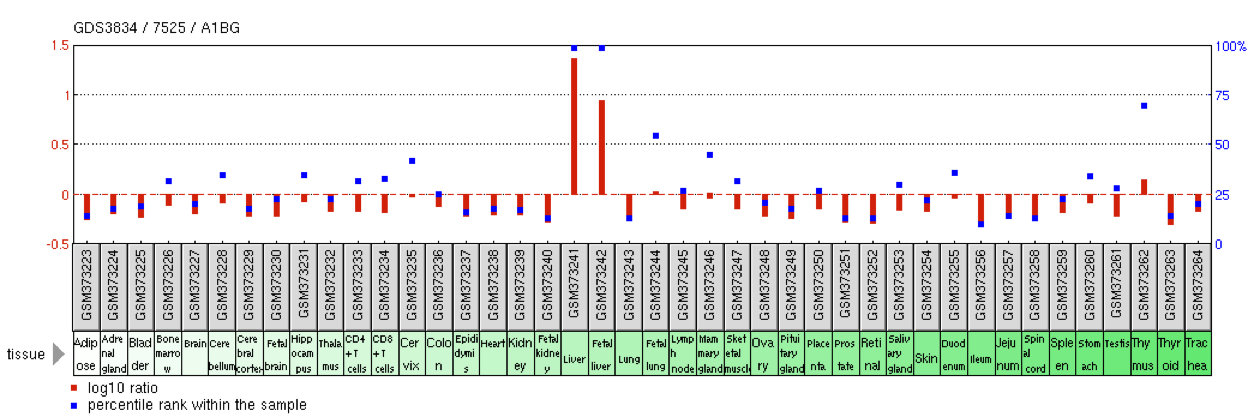

A1BG is expressed at high levels in the adult and fetal liver. Additionally, the mammary gland shows roughly half as much expression as the liver. Trace amounts of A1BG expression can be found in the blood, brain, lung, lymph node, ovary, testis, pancreas, and pancreas. Liver tumors exhibit elevated levels of A1BG transcripts.

== mRNA ==
=== mRNA structure ===
The gene contains 20 distinct introns. Transcription produces 15 different mRNAs, 10 alternatively spliced variants and 5 unspliced forms. There are 4 probable alternative promoters, 4 non overlapping alternative last exons and 7 validated alternative polyadenylation sites. The mRNAs appear to differ by truncation of the 5' end, truncation of the 3' end, presence or absence of 4 cassette exons, overlapping exons with different boundaries, splicing versus retention of 3 introns.

== Protein ==
=== Properties ===
The San Diego Super Computer's Statistical Analysis of Protein (SAPS) program determined that alpha-1B glycoprotein has 495 amino acids residues, an isoelectric point of 5.47, and a molecular mass of 54.3 kDa. Additionally, it suggested that no transmembrane domains exist in alpha-1B glycoprotein. According to NCBI, the amino acid sequence MLVVFLLLWGVTWGPVTEA is a signal peptide on the N-terminus of the protein that might function as an endoplasmic reticulum import signal.

=== Post-translational modifications ===
The NetAcet 1.0 program calculated that the first five amino acid residues serve as an N-acetylation site. The NetGlycate 1.0 program predicted that the lysines located at residue 78, 114, and 227 serve as glycation points. The NetNES 1.1 program predicted the leucine at residue 47 to be a nuclear export signal. The NetNGlyc 1.0 program predicted four N-glycosylation sites - two of which are highly conserved internally repeated sequences. The NetCGlyc1.0 program predicted that none of the tryptophan residues serve as C-mannosylation sites.

=== Protein interactions ===
A study by Udby et al. showed that Cysteine-rich secretory protein 3 is a ligand of alpha-1B glycoprotein in human plasma and they suggest that the A1BG-CRISP-3 complex displays a similar function in protecting the circulation from a potentially harmful effect of free CRISP-3.

=== Sex-specific role in cardiac function ===
Female mice with cardiac conditional knockout of A1BG exhibit poor cardiac function, but male mice with the same knockout are unaffected.

== Homology ==
=== Orthologs ===
In addition to the table below, alpha-1B glycoprotein is also conserved in the white-cheeked crested gibbon, baboon, bolivian squirrel monkey, sheep, dog, wild boar, Chinese tree shrew, Chinese hamster, black flying fox, rabbit, guinea pig, giant panda, cow, rat, and the naked mole-rat. Additionally, it is very likely that A1BG is further conserved throughout the mammalian clade.

Genus species	Organism common name	Divergence from humans (MYA)	NCBI protein accession number	Sequence identity	Protein length	Common gene name
Homo sapiens	Human	--	NP_570602	100%	495	A1BG
Pan troglodytes	Chimpanzee	6.2	XP_001146669	97.0%	501	PREDICTED: Alpha-1B-glycoprotein isoform 4
Pan paniscus	Bonobo	6.3	XP_003816677	97.0%	499	A1BG
Gorilla gorilla gorilla	Gorilla	8.8	XP_004061652	95.0%	275	PREDICTED: alpha-1B-glycoprotein
Pongo pygmaeus	Orangutan	15.7	XP_002829953	95.0%	495	alpha-1B-glycoprotein isoform 1
Macaca mulatta	Rhesus monkey	29.0	XM_001101821	88.0%	351	hypothetical protein EGK_11172, partial
Callithrix jacchus	Marmoset	42.6	XP_002762619	83.0%	500	A1BG
Mus musculus	Mouse	91.0	NP_001074536	44.0%	512	alpha-1B-glycoprotein precursor
Felis catus	Cat	94.2	XP_003997399	62.0%	481	PREDICTED: alpha-1B-glycoprotein
Equus caballus	Horse	97.4	XP_001495344	58.0%	568	PREDICTED: alpha-1B-glycoprotein-like
Loxodonta africana	African bush elephant	104.7	XP_003406722	61.0%	520	PREDICTED: alpha-1B-glycoprotein-like

=== Paralogs ===
No paralogs have been found for alpha-1B glycoprotein.

=== Homologous domains ===
An initial NCBI Blast alignment of alpha-1B glycoprotein illustrates that the protein is mainly composed of three immunoglobulin domains. There is a large segment of amino acids from position 297 to 400 that is not shown to be an immunoglobulin domain. However, a NCBI BLAST alignment of just the amino acids from 297 to 400 does illustrate that the latter sequence is indeed a fourth immunoglobulin domain. Ultimately, alpha-1B glycoprotein seems to be primarily composed of four immunoglobulin domains.

== Clinical significance ==
=== Steroid-resistant nephrotic syndrome ===
The alpha-1-glycoprotein is upregulated 11-fold in the urine of patients who have steroid resistant nephrotic syndrome. A1BG was present in 7/19 patients with SRNS and was absent from all patients with steroid sensitive nephrotic syndrome. The 13.8 kDa A1BG fragment had a high discriminatory power for steroid resistance in pediatric nephrotic syndrome, but is only present in a subset of patients.
