= INO80 complex subunit B =

Protein-coding gene in the species Homo sapiens

INO80B

Identifiers
- Aliases: INO80B, HMGA1L4, HMGIYL4, IES2, PAP-1BP, PAPA-1, ZNHIT4, hIes2, PAPA1, INO80 complex subunit B
- External IDs: OMIM: 616456; MGI: 1917270; GeneCards: INO80B

Gene location (Human)
Chr.	Chromosome 2 (human)
Band	2p13.1	Start	74,455,087 bp
Band	2p13.1	End	74,457,944 bp

Gene location (Mouse)
Chr.	Chromosome 6 (mouse)
Band	6|6 C3	Start	83,098,746 bp
Band	6|6 C3	End	83,102,412 bp
RNA expression pattern
Bgee	Human / Mouse (ortholog); Top expressed in: sural nerve; right uterine tube; left ovary; pituitary gland; fundus; anterior pituitary; thyroid gland; left lobe of thyroid gland; right ovary; skin of abdomen / Top expressed in: internal carotid artery; external carotid artery; interventricular septum; granulocyte; ventricular zone; seminiferous tubule; muscle of thigh; epiblast; left lobe of liver; lip; More reference expression data
BioGPS	n/a
Gene ontology
Molecular function	protein binding; metal ion binding
Cellular component	nucleus; Ino80 complex; nucleoplasm; nucleolus
Biological process	chromatin remodeling; DNA recombination; regulation of transcription, DNA-templated; DNA repair; transcription, DNA-templated; cellular response to DNA damage stimulus; protein deubiquitination
Sources:Amigo / QuickGO
Orthologs
Databases	NCBI: entry; OMA: entry
Species	Human	Mouse
Entrez	83444	70020
Ensembl	ENSG00000115274	ENSMUSG00000030034
UniProt	Q9C086	Q99PT3
RefSeq (mRNA)	NM_031288	NM_023547
RefSeq (protein)	NP_112578	NP_076036
Location (UCSC)	Chr 2: 74.46 – 74.46 Mb	Chr 6: 83.1 – 83.1 Mb
PubMed search
- Wikidata
View/Edit Human	View/Edit Mouse

INO80 complex subunit B is a protein that in humans is encoded by the INO80B gene.

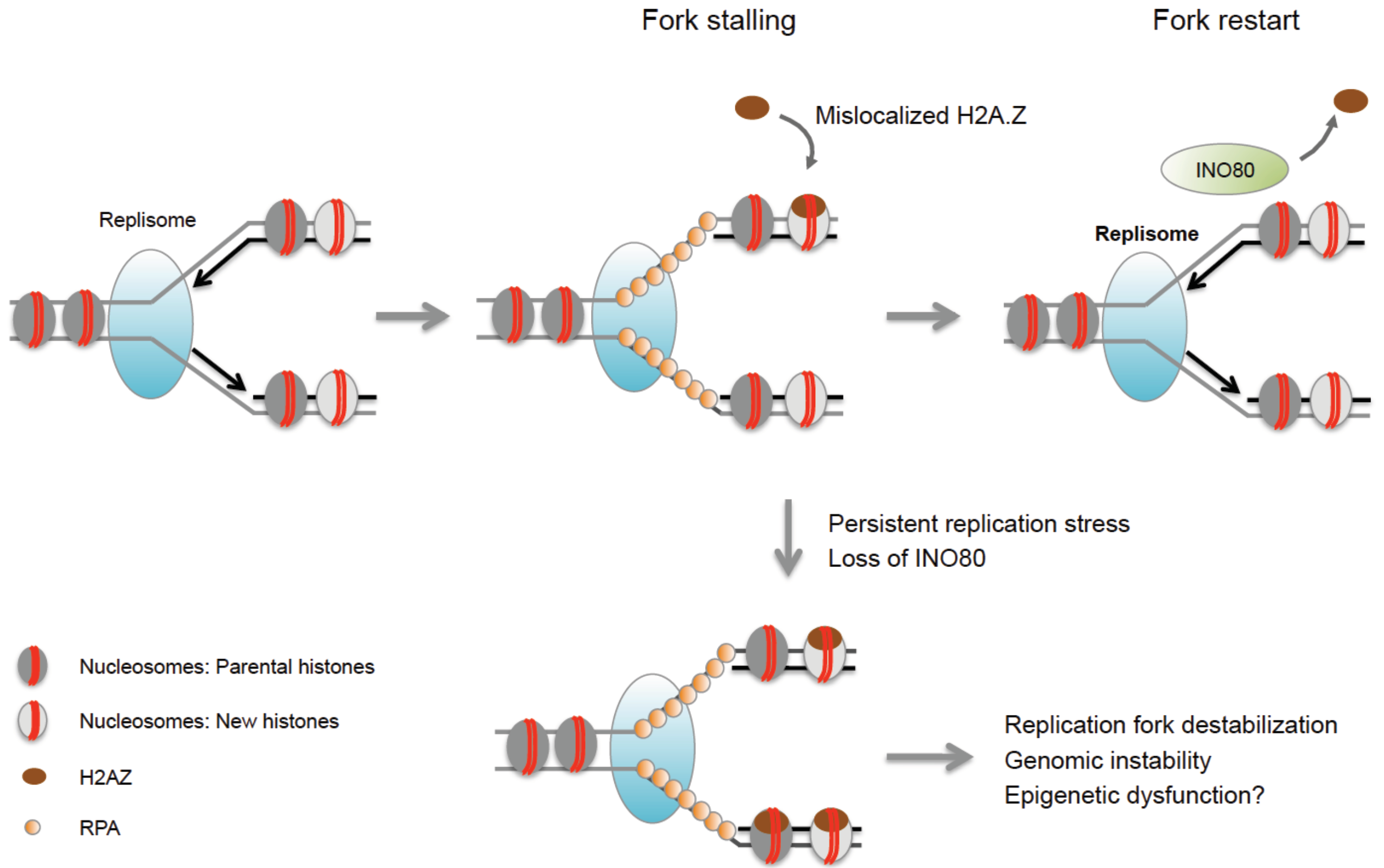
INO80 stabilizes replication forks and counteracts mislocalization of H2A.Z

== Function ==
This gene encodes a subunit of an ATP-dependent chromatin remodeling complex, INO80, which plays a role in DNA and nucleosome-activated ATPase activity and ATP-dependent nucleosome sliding. Readthrough transcription of this gene into the neighboring downstream gene, which encodes WW domain-binding protein 1, generates a non-coding transcript.
