= ECD Corporation =

American computer company

- Type: Private
- Industry: Computer; Electronics
- Founded: 1974; 52 years ago in Cambridge, Massachusetts
- Founders: Ronald Todd; Jerry Roberts; Richard Eckhardt
- Defunct: 1983; 43 years ago
- Fate: Dissolved
- Products: Electronic test equipment; Microcomputers; Computer terminals

ECD Corporation was a small, privately owned American computer and electronics company based in Cambridge, Massachusetts, and active from 1974 to 1983. During its lifespan, the company manufactured a couple pieces of electronic test equipment, the MicroMind microcomputer system, and the Smart ASCII terminal. The company was founded by Ronald Todd, Jerry Roberts, and Richard Eckhardt, three graduates of the Massachusetts Institute of Technology (MIT). Its first product was the C-meter, a capacitance meter released in 1975.

== History ==
ECD was founded in late 1974 by Ronald Todd, Jerry Roberts, and Richard Eckhardt, three graduates of the Massachusetts Institute of Technology (MIT). Todd was named company president. Eckhardt had taken entrepreneurial courses alongside his main studies at MIT, which he cited as helping the company get a head start in the electronics industry. All three were later joined by Edward W. Costello, who became the company's marketing manager. ECD was founded with $5,000 of capital; its first product was the C-meter, a capacitance meter with a liquid-crystal readout, released in spring 1975. The C-meter sold well and allowed the company to move onto their second project, a portable digital thermometer that ran on batteries. Called the T-meter, it was a ruggedized thermometer allowing it to withstand extreme shock in day-to-day industrial transport. The T-meter had a system of thermistor probes, each of which plugged into the base of the unit and able to accurately measure a variety of temperature ranges. The T-meter found widespread acceptance in scientific laboratories and industrial plants. In 1976, ECD earned over US$200,000 in sales and had a backlog of orders worth $1,500,000.

In late 1976, the company announced the MicroMind, a microcomputer system that sold for a little over $980 (equivalent to $4,667 in 2021). The MicroMind was a three-board system, including the central processor board, the display processor board, and the input/output board. The central processor board sports a MOS Technology's 6512 microprocessor that runs the computer's operating system and software; it also features 8 KB of RAM stock. The display processor board contains 2.6 KB of display memory and a RF modulator, allowing a conventional television to be used as a monitor for the computer. The input/output board meanwhile houses the MicroMind's power supply, which has power rails of +5 V and +12 V. The central processing board supports up to 16 KB of RAM; expansion cards were available allowing the computer's RAM to be upgraded in 32 KB intervals.

The MicroMind additionally came shipped with an 80-key ASCII keyboard and various software. Such software packages included a BASIC interpreter with extended functionality (called notsoBASIC), an interactive line editor, a machine code monitor, an assembler, and a cassette file browser. The computer also came packaged with two games: Conway's Game of Life and a "space war" game. Much of ECD's software was written in BASIC by Bob Frankston, a software developer who worked with ECD on a freelance basis. Frankston would later join with Dan Bricklin to found Software Arts in 1979, developers of VisiCalc. In May 1977, ECD won a $1.38 million contract to supply 1,000 MicroMinds across the nation for public schools. The deal was mediated through Avakian System Corporation, a computer consulting business of Glastonbury, Connecticut. The MicroMind may or may not have been followed up with a MicroMind II.

In July 1978, the company released the Smart ASCII, one of the first intelligent video terminals with a 132-column display. A month later, they released a dialect of BASIC that was an extension of Dartmouth BASIC oriented toward small businesses, called ECD Business Basic. Later in 1978, the company developed a bespoke physical specification of floppy disk. Called the Biflex, each disk had a diameter of 4.5 inches and could store up to 512 KB of data.

ECD went defunct in 1983.
