= BAZ2A =

Protein-coding gene in humans

Identifiers
- Aliases: BAZ2A, TIP5, WALp3, bromodomain adjacent to zinc finger domain 2A
- External IDs: OMIM: 605682; MGI: 2151152; GeneCards: BAZ2A
Available structures
PDB	Ortholog search: PDBe RCSB
PDB	List of PDB id codes 4LZ2, 4Q6F, 4QBM, 4QF2, 5AGQ

Gene location (Human)
Chr.	Chromosome 12 (human)
Band	12q13.3	Start	56,595,596 bp
Band	12q13.3	End	56,636,816 bp

Gene location (Mouse)
Chr.	Chromosome 10 (mouse)
Band	10|10 D3	Start	127,927,446 bp
Band	10|10 D3	End	127,965,172 bp
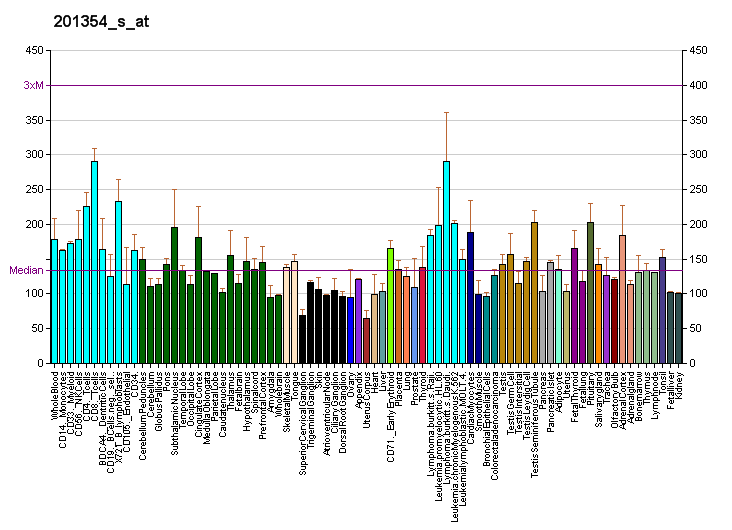

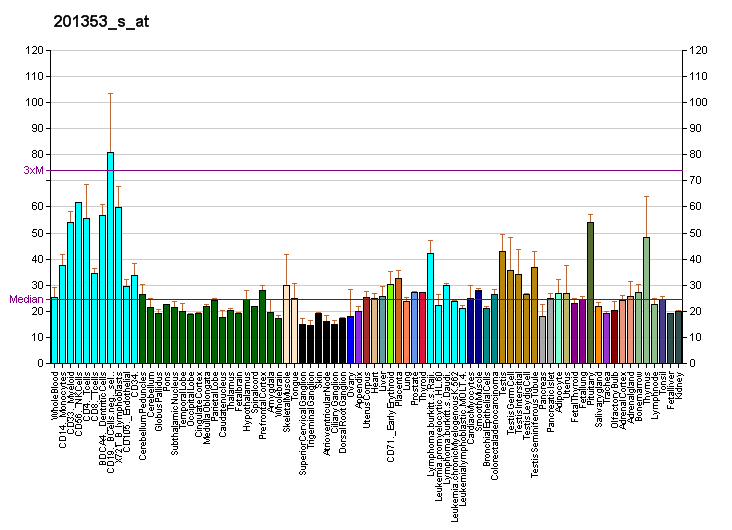

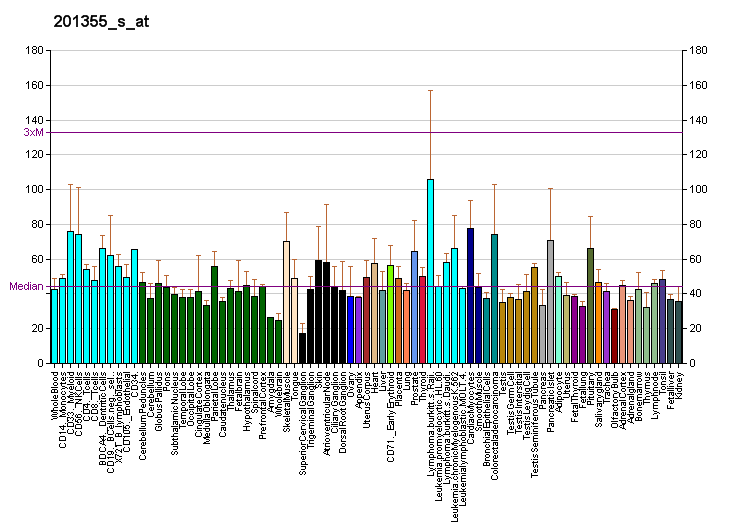
RNA expression pattern
Bgee	Human / Mouse (ortholog); Top expressed in: sural nerve; epithelium of colon; beta cell; gastric mucosa; bone marrow cell; right uterine tube; left ovary; body of uterus; right ovary; tendon of biceps brachii / Top expressed in: zygote; female urethra; blood; hair follicle; tibiofemoral joint; lymph node; mesenteric lymph nodes; Gonadal ridge; secondary oocyte; granulocyte; More reference expression data
BioGPS	More reference expression data
Gene ontology
Molecular function	DNA binding; RNA polymerase I core promoter sequence-specific DNA binding; histone binding; metal ion binding; protein binding; nuclear receptor binding; lysine-acetylated histone binding; RNA binding
Cellular component	rDNA heterochromatin; chromatin silencing complex; nucleolus; nucleus; cytosol; nuclear speck
Biological process	chromatin remodeling; regulation of transcription, DNA-templated; transcription, DNA-templated; DNA methylation; rDNA heterochromatin assembly; histone deacetylation; RNA polymerase I preinitiation complex assembly; chromatin organization
Sources:Amigo / QuickGO
Orthologs
Databases	NCBI: entry; OMA: entry
Species	Human	Mouse
Entrez	11176	116848
Ensembl	ENSG00000076108	ENSMUSG00000040054
UniProt	Q9UIF9	Q91YE5
RefSeq (mRNA)	NM_001300905; NM_013449; NM_001351156	NM_054078
RefSeq (protein)	NP_001287834; NP_038477; NP_001338085	n/a
Location (UCSC)	Chr 12: 56.6 – 56.64 Mb	Chr 10: 127.93 – 127.97 Mb
PubMed search
- Wikidata
View/Edit Human	View/Edit Mouse

Bromodomain adjacent to zinc finger domain protein 2A is a protein that in humans is encoded by the BAZ2A gene.
