= POLE3 =

Protein-coding gene in the species Homo sapiens

Identifiers
- Aliases: POLE3, CHARAC17, CHRAC17, YBL1, p17, polymerase (DNA) epsilon 3, accessory subunit, DNA polymerase epsilon 3, accessory subunit, CHRAC2
- External IDs: OMIM: 607267; MGI: 1933378; GeneCards: POLE3

Gene location (Human)
Chr.	Chromosome 9 (human)
Band	9q32	Start	113,407,235 bp
Band	9q32	End	113,410,675 bp

Gene location (Mouse)
Chr.	Chromosome 4 (mouse)
Band	4|4 B3	Start	62,440,886 bp
Band	4|4 B3	End	62,443,305 bp
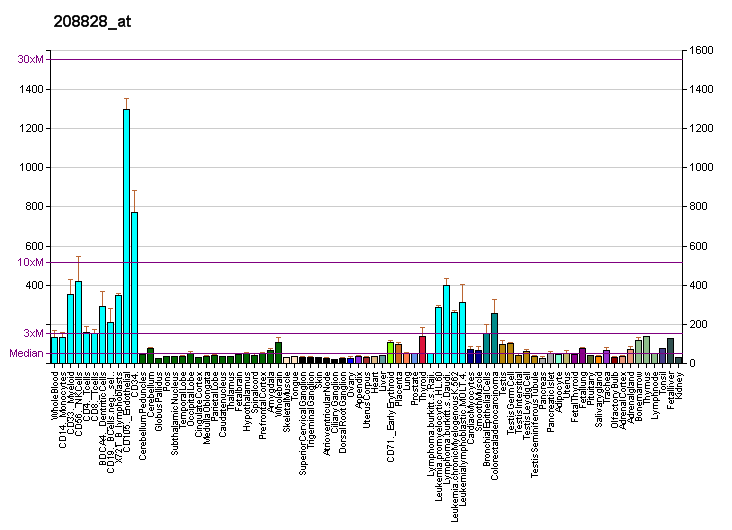
RNA expression pattern
Bgee	Human / Mouse (ortholog); Top expressed in: gonad; gastrocnemius muscle; granulocyte; monocyte; human penis; ganglionic eminence; muscle of thigh; rectum; ventricular zone; bone marrow / Top expressed in: spermatocyte; ventricular zone; yolk sac; secondary oocyte; zygote; fetal liver hematopoietic progenitor cell; seminiferous tubule; morula; molar; mandibular prominence; More reference expression data
BioGPS	More reference expression data
Gene ontology
Molecular function	transferase activity; DNA binding; DNA-directed DNA polymerase activity; nucleotidyltransferase activity; protein binding; protein heterodimerization activity; histone acetyltransferase activity
Cellular component	epsilon DNA polymerase complex; nucleus; nucleoplasm
Biological process	DNA replication; histone H3 acetylation; DNA biosynthetic process; G1/S transition of mitotic cell cycle; cellular response to DNA damage stimulus; CENP-A containing chromatin assembly; cellular response to gamma radiation; DNA replication initiation; telomere maintenance via semi-conservative replication
Sources:Amigo / QuickGO
Orthologs
Databases	NCBI: entry; OMA: entry
Species	Human	Mouse
Entrez	54107	59001
Ensembl	ENSG00000148229	ENSMUSG00000028394
UniProt	Q9NRF9	Q9JKP7
RefSeq (mRNA)	NM_001278255; NM_017443	NM_021498
RefSeq (protein)	NP_001265184; NP_059139	NP_067473
Location (UCSC)	Chr 9: 113.41 – 113.41 Mb	Chr 4: 62.44 – 62.44 Mb
PubMed search
- Wikidata
View/Edit Human	View/Edit Mouse

DNA polymerase epsilon subunit 3 is an enzyme that in humans is encoded by the POLE3 gene.

POLE3 is a histone-fold protein that interacts with other histone-fold proteins to bind DNA in a sequence-independent manner. These histone-fold protein dimers combine within larger enzymatic complexes for DNA transcription, replication, and packaging.[supplied by OMIM]

== Interactions ==
POLE3 has been shown to interact with SMARCA5.
