= CUT domain =

CUT
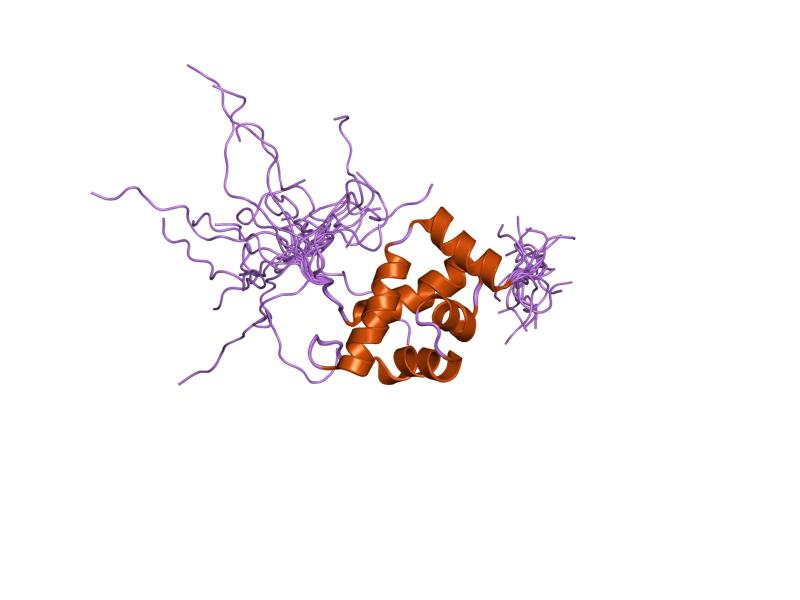
- solution structure of the second cut domain of human satb2

Identifiers
- Symbol: CUT
- Pfam: PF02376
- InterPro: IPR003350
- SCOP2: 1wh6 / SCOPe / SUPFAM
Available protein structures:
- Pfam: structures / ECOD
- PDB: RCSB PDB; PDBe; PDBj
- PDBsum: structure summary

In molecular biology, the CUT domain (also known as ONECUT) is a DNA-binding motif which can bind independently or in cooperation with the homeodomain, which is often found downstream of the CUT domain. Proteins display two modes of DNA binding, which hinge on the homeodomain and on the linker that separates it from the CUT domain, and two modes of transcriptional stimulation, which hinge on the homeodomain.
