= Kruppel like factor 16 =

Protein-coding gene in the species Homo sapiens

KLF16

Identifiers
- Aliases: KLF16, BTEB4, DRRF, NSLP2, Kruppel-like factor 16, Kruppel like factor 16
- External IDs: OMIM: 606139; MGI: 2153049; GeneCards: KLF16

Gene location (Human)
Chr.	Chromosome 19 (human)
Band	19p13.3	Start	1,852,399 bp
Band	19p13.3	End	1,863,579 bp

Gene location (Mouse)
Chr.	Chromosome 10 (mouse)
Band	10|10 C1	Start	80,402,958 bp
Band	10|10 C1	End	80,413,155 bp
RNA expression pattern
Bgee	Human / Mouse (ortholog); Top expressed in: nucleus accumbens; putamen; caudate nucleus; granulocyte; cingulate gyrus; anterior cingulate cortex; amygdala; monocyte; right frontal lobe; prefrontal cortex / Top expressed in: zygote; superior frontal gyrus; visual cortex; dentate gyrus of hippocampal formation granule cell; cumulus cell; secondary oocyte; primary visual cortex; epiblast; primary oocyte; female urethra; More reference expression data
BioGPS	n/a
Gene ontology
Molecular function	DNA-binding transcription factor activity; RNA polymerase II cis-regulatory region sequence-specific DNA binding; DNA binding; DNA-binding transcription repressor activity, RNA polymerase II-specific; metal ion binding; nucleic acid binding; DNA-binding transcription factor activity, RNA polymerase II-specific
Cellular component	nucleus
Biological process	regulation of transcription by RNA polymerase II; dopamine receptor signaling pathway; regulation of transcription, DNA-templated; negative regulation of transcription by RNA polymerase II; transcription, DNA-templated
Sources:Amigo / QuickGO
Orthologs
Databases	NCBI: entry; OMA: entry
Species	Human	Mouse
Entrez	83855	118445
Ensembl	ENSG00000129911	ENSMUSG00000035397
UniProt	Q9BXK1	P58334
RefSeq (mRNA)	NM_031918	NM_078477
RefSeq (protein)	NP_114124	NP_510962
Location (UCSC)	Chr 19: 1.85 – 1.86 Mb	Chr 10: 80.4 – 80.41 Mb
PubMed search
- Wikidata
View/Edit Human	View/Edit Mouse

Kruppel like factor 16 is a protein that in humans is encoded by the KLF16 gene.
