= Protein ecdysoneless homolog =

Protein-coding gene in the species Homo sapiens

ECD

Identifiers
- Aliases: ECD, GCR2, HSGT1, SGT1, ecdysoneless cell cycle regulator
- External IDs: OMIM: 616464; MGI: 1917851; HomoloGene: 5256; GeneCards: ECD; OMA:ECD - orthologs

Gene location (Human)
Chr.	Chromosome 10 (human)
Band	10q22.2	Start	73,130,155 bp
Band	10q22.2	End	73,169,055 bp

Gene location (Mouse)
Chr.	Chromosome 14 (mouse)
Band	14|14 A3	Start	20,369,920 bp
Band	14|14 A3	End	20,398,189 bp
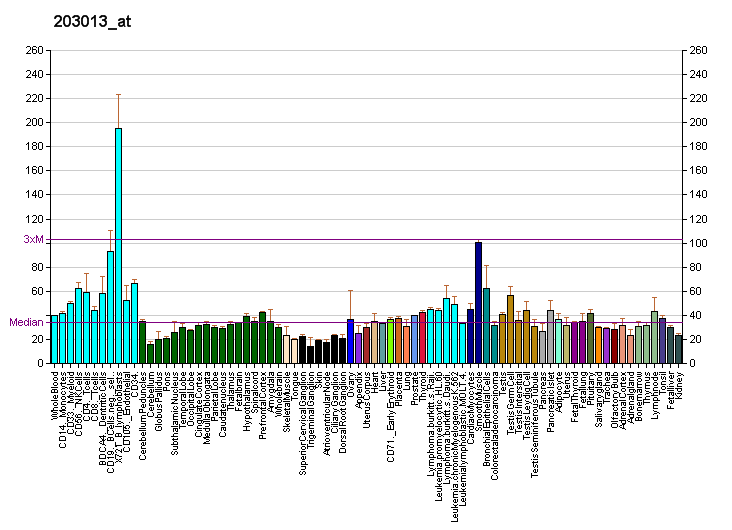
RNA expression pattern
Bgee	Human / Mouse (ortholog); Top expressed in: sural nerve; Achilles tendon; islet of Langerhans; ganglionic eminence; tendon of biceps brachii; popliteal artery; tibial arteries; ventricular zone; testicle; stromal cell of endometrium / Top expressed in: internal carotid artery; external carotid artery; Rostral migratory stream; fetal liver hematopoietic progenitor cell; spermatocyte; epiblast; primitive streak; hair follicle; lacrimal gland; parotid gland; More reference expression data
BioGPS	More reference expression data
Gene ontology
Molecular function	transcription coactivator activity; protein binding; histone acetyltransferase binding
Cellular component	cytoplasm; nucleus; nucleoplasm; R2TP complex; cytosol
Biological process	regulation of G1/S transition of mitotic cell cycle; cell population proliferation; regulation of transcription, DNA-templated; transcription by RNA polymerase II; transcription, DNA-templated; regulation of glycolytic process; positive regulation of transcription by RNA polymerase II; RNA splicing; mRNA processing
Sources:Amigo / QuickGO
Orthologs
Species	Human	Mouse
Entrez	11319	70601
Ensembl	ENSG00000122882	ENSMUSG00000021810
UniProt	O95905	Q9CS74
RefSeq (mRNA)	NM_001135752; NM_001135753; NM_007265	NM_027475
RefSeq (protein)	NP_001129224; NP_001129225; NP_009196	NP_081751
Location (UCSC)	Chr 10: 73.13 – 73.17 Mb	Chr 14: 20.37 – 20.4 Mb
PubMed search
- Wikidata
View/Edit Human	View/Edit Mouse

Protein ecdysoneless homolog is a protein that in humans is encoded by the ECD gene.

== Clinical significane ==
ECD expression has been linked to lower survival rates for lung adenocarcinoma patients.
