= WDR83 =

Protein-coding gene in the species Homo sapiens

Identifiers
- Aliases: WDR83, MORG1, WD repeat domain 83
- External IDs: OMIM: 616850; MGI: 1915086; GeneCards: WDR83

Gene location (Human)
Chr.	Chromosome 19 (human)
Band	19p13.13	Start	12,666,802 bp
Band	19p13.13	End	12,675,832 bp

Gene location (Mouse)
Chr.	Chromosome 8 (mouse)
Band	8|8 C3	Start	85,801,664 bp
Band	8|8 C3	End	85,807,935 bp
RNA expression pattern
Bgee	Human / Mouse (ortholog); Top expressed in: right hemisphere of cerebellum; prefrontal cortex; right frontal lobe; Brodmann area 9; granulocyte; anterior cingulate cortex; apex of heart; gonad; hypothalamus; skin of leg / Top expressed in: right kidney; ventricular zone; neural layer of retina; proximal tubule; dentate gyrus of hippocampal formation granule cell; embryo; lip; embryo; primary visual cortex; neural tube; More reference expression data
BioGPS	n/a
Gene ontology
Molecular function	protein binding
Cellular component	cytoplasm; catalytic step 2 spliceosome; spliceosomal complex; endosome membrane; nucleus
Biological process	mRNA splicing, via spliceosome; RNA splicing, via transesterification reactions; mRNA processing; MAPK cascade; RNA splicing
Sources:Amigo / QuickGO
Orthologs
Databases	NCBI: entry; OMA: entry
Species	Human	Mouse
Entrez	84292	67836
Ensembl	ENSG00000123154	ENSMUSG00000005150
UniProt	Q9BRX9	Q9DAJ4
RefSeq (mRNA)	NM_001099737; NM_032332	NM_026399
RefSeq (protein)	NP_001093207; NP_115708	NP_080675
Location (UCSC)	Chr 19: 12.67 – 12.68 Mb	Chr 8: 85.8 – 85.81 Mb
PubMed search
- Wikidata
View/Edit Human	View/Edit Mouse

WD repeat domain 83 is a protein that in humans is encoded by the WDR83 gene.

== Function ==
This gene encodes a member of the WD-40 protein family. The protein is proposed to function as a molecular scaffold for various multimeric protein complexes. The protein associates with several components of the extracellular signal-regulated kinase (ERK) pathway, and promotes ERK activity in response to serum or other signals. The protein also interacts with egl nine homolog 3 (EGLN3, also known as PHD3) and regulates expression of hypoxia-inducible factor 1, and has been purified as part of the spliceosome. Alternative splicing results in multiple transcript variants.
