= BAP1 =

Protein-coding gene in the species Homo sapiens

Identifiers
- Aliases: BAP1, HUCEP-13, UCHL2, hucep-6, BRCA1 associated protein 1, KURIS
- External IDs: OMIM: 603089; MGI: 1206586; HomoloGene: 3421; GeneCards: BAP1; OMA:BAP1 - orthologs

Gene location (Human)
Chr.	Chromosome 3 (human)
Band	3p21.1	Start	52,401,008 bp
Band	3p21.1	End	52,410,008 bp

Gene location (Mouse)
Chr.	Chromosome 14 (mouse)
Band	14|14 B	Start	30,973,407 bp
Band	14|14 B	End	30,981,901 bp
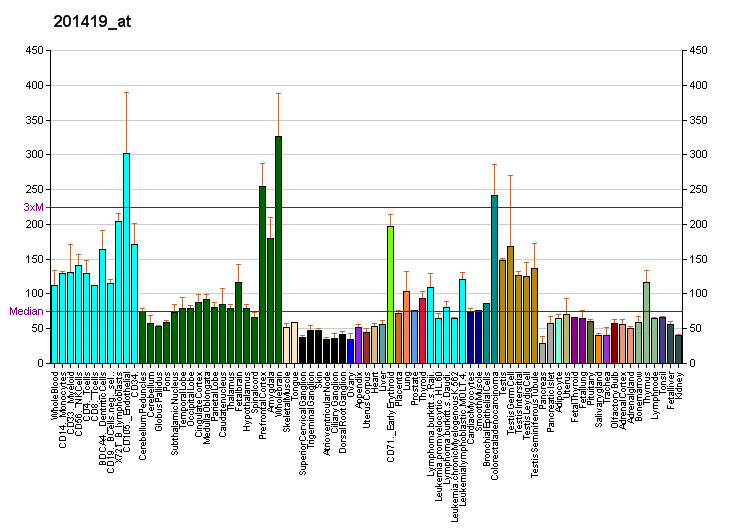
RNA expression pattern
Bgee	Human / Mouse (ortholog); Top expressed in: left testis; right testis; right frontal lobe; anterior cingulate cortex; prefrontal cortex; amygdala; right hemisphere of cerebellum; skin of abdomen; skin of leg; Brodmann area 9 / Top expressed in: Rostral migratory stream; condyle; fossa; motor neuron; vas deferens; facial motor nucleus; Paneth cell; abdominal wall; temporal lobe; piriform cortex; More reference expression data
BioGPS	More reference expression data
Gene ontology
Molecular function	peptidase activity; hydrolase activity; chromatin binding; cysteine-type peptidase activity; thiol-dependent deubiquitinase; protein binding
Cellular component	cytoplasm; PR-DUB complex; intracellular anatomical structure; nucleus; nucleoplasm; cytosol
Biological process	ubiquitin-dependent protein catabolic process; regulation of cell cycle; negative regulation of cell population proliferation; proteolysis; regulation of cell growth; monoubiquitinated protein deubiquitination; positive regulation of protein targeting to mitochondrion; protein K48-linked deubiquitination; monoubiquitinated histone H2A deubiquitination; response to inorganic substance; protein deubiquitination; regulation of inflammatory response; macrophage homeostasis; regulation of cytokine production involved in inflammatory response; chromatin organization
Sources:Amigo / QuickGO
Orthologs
Species	Human	Mouse
Entrez	8314	104416
Ensembl	ENSG00000163930	ENSMUSG00000021901
UniProt	Q92560	Q99PU7
RefSeq (mRNA)	NM_004656	NM_027088
RefSeq (protein)	NP_004647	NP_081364
Location (UCSC)	Chr 3: 52.4 – 52.41 Mb	Chr 14: 30.97 – 30.98 Mb
PubMed search
- Wikidata
View/Edit Human	View/Edit Mouse

BRCA1 associated protein-1 (ubiquitin carboxy-terminal hydrolase) is a deubiquitinating enzyme that in humans is encoded by the BAP1 gene. BAP1 encodes an 80.4 kDa nuclear-localizing protein with a ubiquitin carboxy-terminal hydrolase (UCH) domain that gives BAP1 its deubiquitinase activity. Recent studies have shown that BAP1 and its fruit fly homolog, Calypso, are members of the polycomb-group proteins (PcG) of highly conserved transcriptional repressors required for long-term silencing of genes that regulate cell fate determination, stem cell pluripotency, and other developmental processes.

== Nomenclature ==
BAP1 is also known as:

- UniProt name: Ubiquitin carboxyl-terminal hydrolase BAP1
- ubiquitin carboxyl-terminal hydrolase like-2 (UCHL2)
- human cerebral protein 6 (hucep 6)
- human cerebral protein-13 (hucep-13)

== Gene ==
In humans, BAP1 is encoded by the BAP1 gene located on the short arm of chromosome 3 (3p21.31-p21.2).

== Structure ==
Human BAP1 is 729 amino acids long and has three domains:

1. a ubiquitin carboxyl-terminal hydrolase (UCH) N-terminus catalytic domain, which removes ubiquitin from ubiquitylated substrates: residues 1-240, with an active site comprising the Cysteine91, Alanine95, and Glycine178 residues.
2. a unique linker region, which includes a Host cell factor C1 binding domain at residues 356-385.
3. a C-terminal domain: residues 598-729, which includes a UCH37-like domain (ULD) at residues 675-693 and two Nuclear localization sequences at residues 656-661 and 717-722.

== Function ==
In both Drosophila and humans, BAP1 functions as the catalytic subunit of the Polycomb repressive deubiquitinase (PR-DUB) complex, which controls homeobox genes by regulating the amount of ubiquitinated Histone H2A in Nucleosomes bound to their promoters. In flies and humans, the PR-DUB complex is formed through the interaction of BAP1 and ASXL1 (Asx in fruit flies) BAP1 has also been shown to associate with other factors involved in chromatin modulation and transcriptional regulation, such as Host cell factor C1, which acts as an adaptor to couple E2F transcription factors to chromatin-modifying complexes during cell cycle progression.

== Role in disease ==
In cancer, BAP1 can function both as a tumor suppressor and as a metastasis suppressor.

=== Somatic mutations in cancer ===
- BAP1 somatic mutations were identified in a small number of breast and lung cancer cell lines, but BAP1 was first shown to act as a tumor suppressor in cultured cells, where its deubiquitinase (UCH) domain and nuclear localization sequences were required for BAP1 to suppress cell growth.
- In 2010, J. William Harbour and colleagues published a landmark article in Science, in which they used exome sequencing of patient tumor samples and identified inactivating mutations in BAP1 in 47% of uveal melanomas. They were also the first to show germline BAP1 mutations, and that BAP1 mutation was strongly associated with metastasis. These mutations included multiple nonsense mutations and splice site mutations throughout the gene. Missense mutations were only found within the UCH and ULD domains, further supporting the requirement for BAP1 catalytic function. This study also identified a germline mutation in one of the uveal melanoma patients, suggesting that, besides being a metastasis suppressor, BAP1 could predispose certain people to more aggressive uveal melanoma tumors.
- BAP1 mutations have been identified in aggressive mesotheliomas with similar mutations as seen in melanomas,.
- Mutations in the tumor suppressor gene BAP1 occur in approximately 15% of clear cell renal cell carcinoma (CCRCC) cases. Sequencing efforts demonstrated worse outcomes in patients with BAP1 mutated clear cell renal cell carcinoma.

=== BAP1 tumor predisposition syndrome ===
Two studies used genome sequencing independently to identify germline mutations in BAP1 in families with genetic predispositions to mesothelioma and melanocytic skin tumors The atypical melanocytic lesions resemble Spitz nevi and have been characterized as "atypical Spitz tumors" (ASTs), although they have a unique histology and exhibit both BRAF and BAP1 mutations. Further studies have identified germline BAP1 mutations associated with other cancers. These studies suggest that germline mutation of BAP1 results in a Tumor Predisposition Syndrome linking BAP1 to many more cancers.

== Immunochemistry ==
Immunohistochemistry for BAP1 is a prognostic biomarker to predict poor oncologic outcomes and adverse clinicopathological features in patients with non-metastatic clear cell renal cell carcinoma (CCRCC). BAP1 assessment using immunohistochemistry on needle biopsy may benefit preoperative risk stratification and guide treatment planning.

== Interactions ==
BAP1 has been shown to interact with

- AHCYL2
- ANAPC7
- ANKRD17
- ASXL1
- ASXL2
- BRCA1
- CBX1
- CBX3
- EIF4EBP3
- FOXK1
- FOXK2
- HAT1
- HCFC1
- HIST2H2AC
- HSPA2
- IPO4
- IPO5
- KDM1B
- OGT
- PPM1G
- PSME3
- RBBP7
- UBE2O
