= TMEM61 =

Protein and coding gene in humans

Identifiers
- Aliases: TMEM61, transmembrane protein 61
- External IDs: MGI: 3041156; HomoloGene: 52319; GeneCards: TMEM61; OMA:TMEM61 - orthologs

Gene location (Human)
Chr.	Chromosome 1 (human)
Band	1p32.3	Start	54,980,628 bp
Band	1p32.3	End	54,992,288 bp

Gene location (Mouse)
Chr.	Chromosome 4 (mouse)
Band	4|4 C7	Start	106,356,010 bp
Band	4|4 C7	End	106,397,743 bp
RNA expression pattern
Bgee	Human / Mouse (ortholog); Top expressed in: parotid gland; anterior pituitary; testicle; human kidney; bronchial epithelial cell; minor salivary glands; seminal vesicula; olfactory zone of nasal mucosa; mucosa of transverse colon; left adrenal cortex / Top expressed in: right kidney; stria vascularis; hair follicle; human kidney; urinary bladder; sciatic nerve; renal cortex; lobe of prostate; mouth; lip; More reference expression data
BioGPS	n/a
Orthologs
Species	Human	Mouse
Entrez	199964	329909
Ensembl	ENSG00000143001	ENSMUSG00000085933
UniProt	Q8N0U2	n/a
RefSeq (mRNA)	NM_182532	NM_001370848
RefSeq (protein)	NP_872338	n/a
Location (UCSC)	Chr 1: 54.98 – 54.99 Mb	Chr 4: 106.36 – 106.4 Mb
PubMed search
- Wikidata
View/Edit Human	View/Edit Mouse

Transmembrane protein 61 (TMEM61) is a protein that is encoded by the TMEM61 gene in humans. It is located on the first chromosome in humans and is highly expressed in the intestinal regions predominantly the kidney, adrenal gland and pituitary tissues. The protein, unlike other transmembrane protein in the region does not promote cancer growth. However, the TMEM61 protein when inhibited by secondary factors restricts normal activity in the kidney. The human protein shares many Orthologs and has been prevalent on Earth for millions of years.

== Gene ==
=== Aliases ===
There are no known aliases of TMEM61. The human protein can be identified with any tool that uses UniProt by Q8N0U2.

=== Location ===
TMEM61 is located on the plus strand of the human chromosome 1 at the locus 1 p32.3. The gene is 11, 661 base pairs long, it ranges from position 54,980,628 to 54,992,288 on chromosome 1. TMEM61 lies between LOC124904184 and BSND.

=== Transcript variants ===
NCBI RefSeq contains seven mRNA transcript variants for TMEM61. Transcription variants X1, X2, and X2 both are splices of the original protein, but all three isoforms have their own variants. None of the variants share similar exon boundaries, domain or disordered regions.

Name	Accession number	Number of Exons	Domain	Size (bp)
Transcript Variant 1	NM_182532.3	3	2	1256
Transcript Variant X1	XM_011540911.3	0	0	971
Transcript Variant X2	XM_005270586.5	0	0	844
Transcript Variant X2	XM_011540912.3	0	0	1747
Transcript Variant X1	XM_054334900.1	0	0	998
Transcript Variant X2	XM_054334901.1	0	0	865
Transcript Variant X2	XM_054334902.1	0	0	1747

== Protein ==
=== Isoforms ===
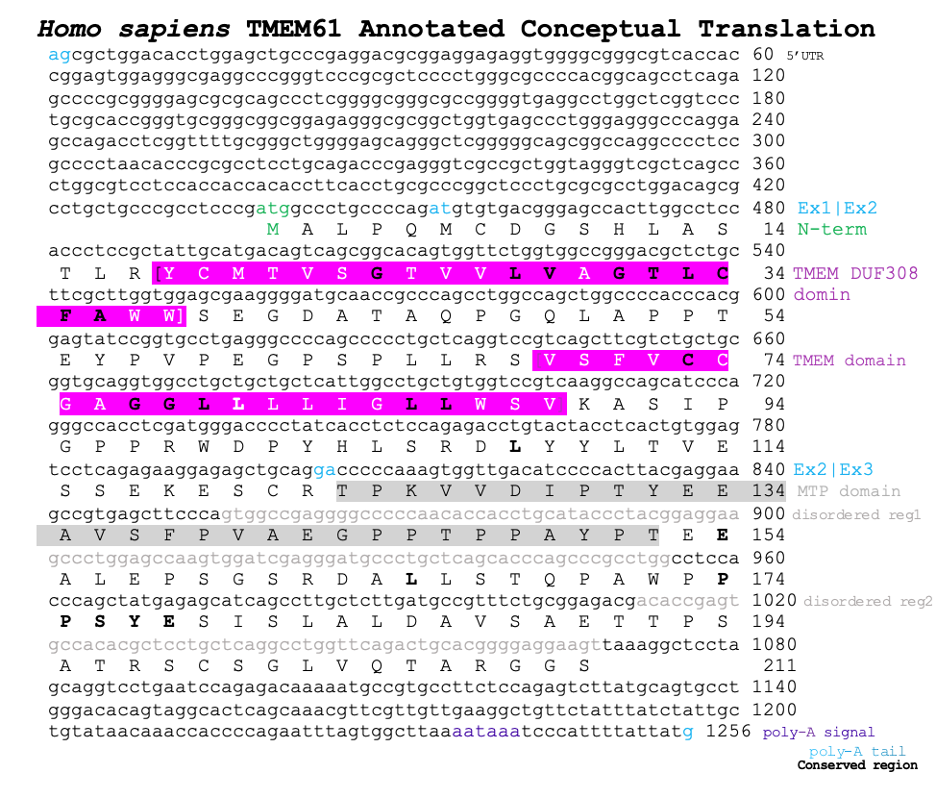
Conceptual Translation of TMEM61

There are six known Isoforms of the TMEM61 protein, Isoform X1 is encoded by transcript variant X1, and Isoform X2 with variant X2 and so on. There are two different X2 isoforms, but both have the same amino acid sequence, both the X2 have five less amino acids in the start of the protein, which differs from isoform X1 with same protein sequence and size as the original protein.

Name	Accession number	Size (aa)	Predicted Molecular Weight (kDa)
Isoform 1	NP_872338.1	210	22.2
Isoform X1	XP_011539213.1	210	22.2
Isoform X2	XP_005270643.1	205	21.6
Isoform X2	XP_011539214.1	205	21.6
Isoform X1	XP_054190875.1	210	22.2
Isoform X2	XP_054190876.1	205	21.6
Isoform X2	XP_054190877.1	205	21.6

=== Protein characteristics ===
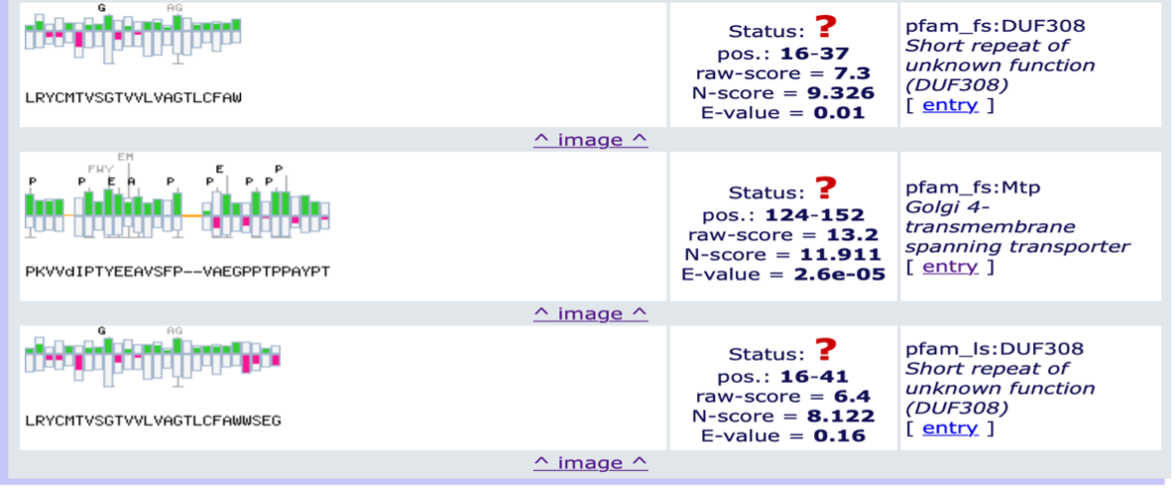
MyHits Motif Scan with evalues

The Isoform 1 of the TMEM61 protein is made up of 210 amino acids. The protein has a predicted molecular weight of about 22.2 KDa and a theoretical isoelectric point of about 4.54. In terms of amino acid composition, TMEM61 is relatively rich in both the hydrophobic Proline and hydrophilic Serine. The protein is relatively poor in both hydrophilic Asparagine and Lysine. It is also poor in both hydrophobic Isoleucine and Phenylalanine. The protein indicates acid components from it addition of Arginine and Lysine subtracted to the addition of Glutamic Acid and Aspartic Acid.

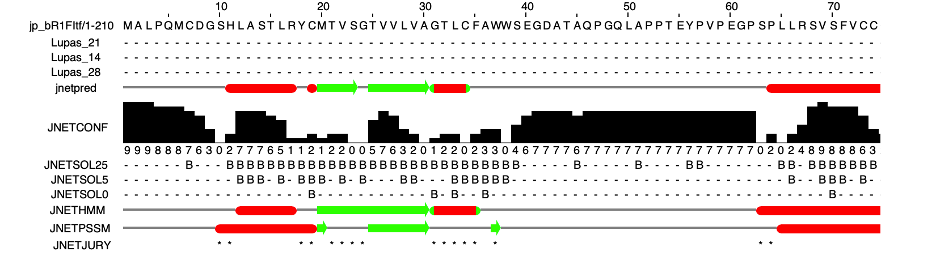
Ali2D configured Helix Beta distribution

=== Domains ===
TMEM61 Isoform 1 contains two transmembrane domains one of encompasses a DUF domain. TMEM61 also contains a MTP domain, unlike the transmembrane domain this domains located in the Golgi Apparatus and involves spanning transportation. All four domain regions had low value scores except the second TMEM domain was not able to be scored.

Domain Name	Amino Acid
TMEM	18-38
DUF308	16-37 or 16-41
TMEM	69-89
MTP	124-152

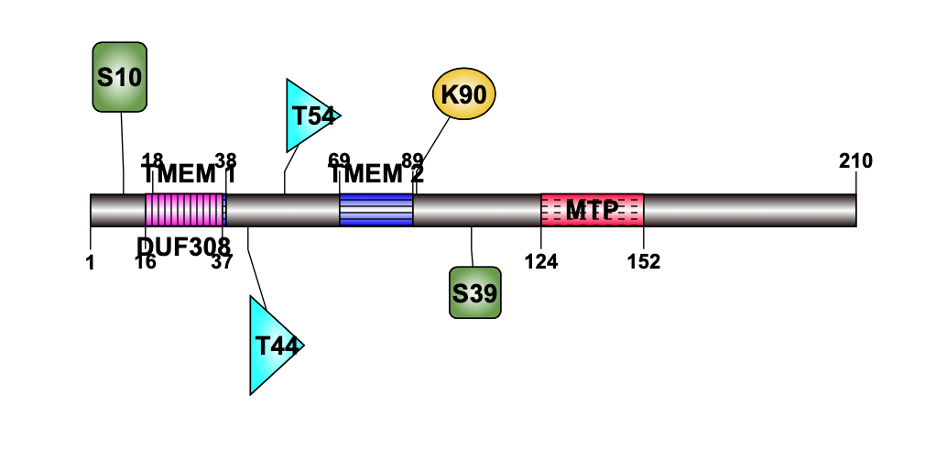
IBS configuration of TMEM61 with post-translation modification

=== Secondary structure ===
The Ali2D, and I-TASSER models predicted that the secondary structure of TMEM61 has both alpha helices and beta strands.

=== Tertiary structure ===
No confident model for tertiary structure for TMEM61.

=== Post-translational modifications ===
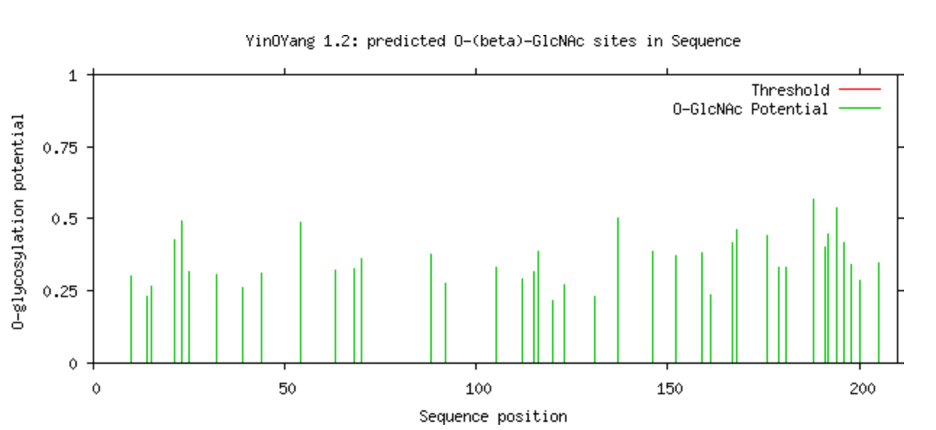
Glycosylation of TMEM61

While the modification are few, phosphorylation will not result in a change oil the amino acid for TMEM61, this is a result of the lack of glycosylation that takes place in the sequence. Results are represented by graph on bottom right.

TMEM61 Sites	Kinase	Tools
V26-30	N/A	GPS-Sumo
K90	N/A	GPS-Sumo
S10	AGC	GPS
S14	AGC	GPS
T15	AGC	GPS
T21	AGC	GPS
T23	AGC	GPS
T25	AGC	GPS
T32	AGC	GPS
S39	AGC	GPS
T44	AGC	GPS
T54	AGC	GPS

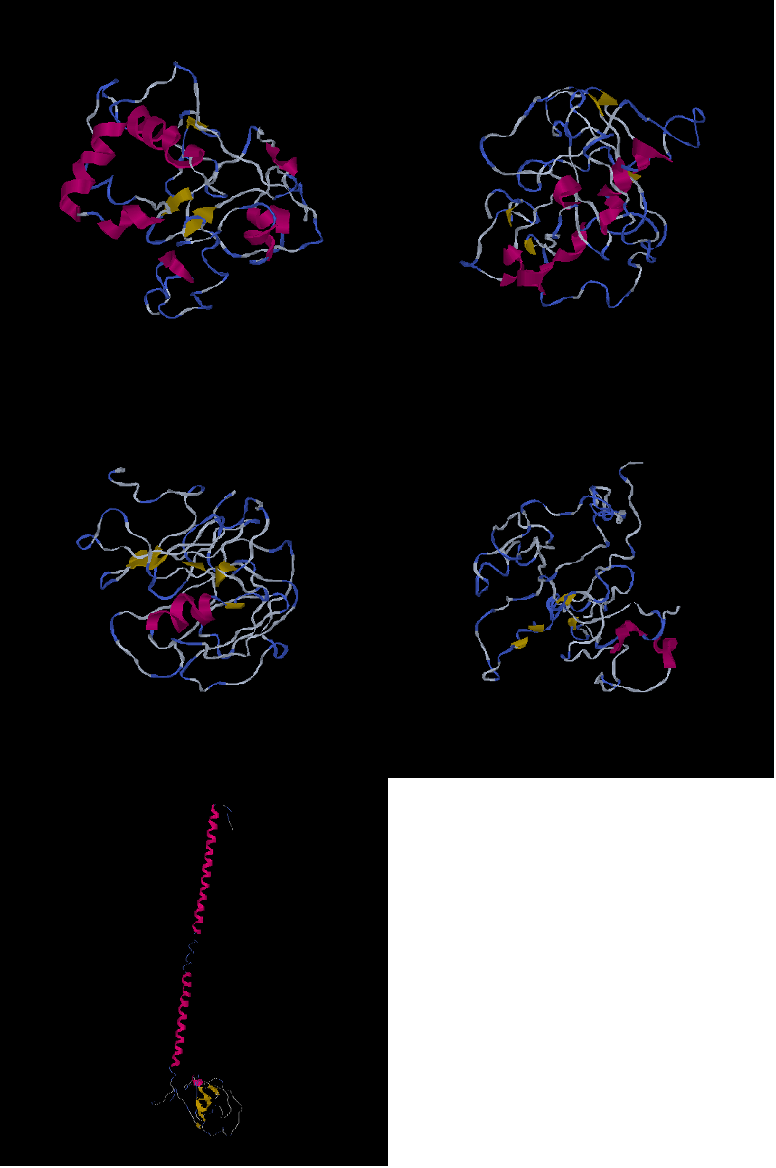
I-TASSER Predicted 3D model of TMEM61

=== Subcellular localization ===
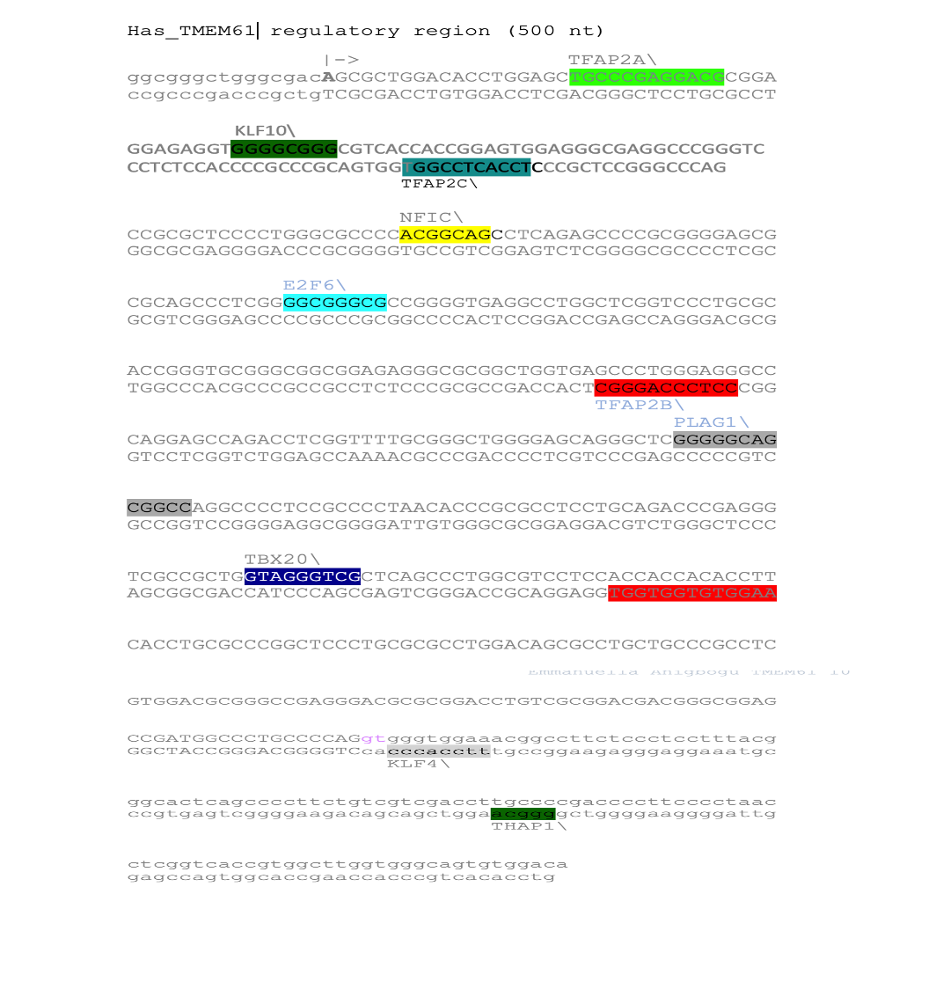
TMEM61 transcription factors

Immunofluorescent standing experiments have detected the TMEM61 protein in the endocrine tissues, kidney and Urinary bladder, and proximal digestive tract. The experiment also found slight expression in the brain tissues.

== Regulation and expression ==
=== Transcription factors ===
Position	Score	strand	TranscriptionFactor Name
473	682	+	E2F6\
376	528	-	TFAP2B\
58	514	-	KLF4\
170	522	-	NFIC\
564	548	+	Tbx6\
488	537	+	PLAG1\
235	512	-	THAP1\
376	510	+	TFAP2C\
59	494	+	KLF10\
376	493	-	TFAP2A\
53	489	-	ZNF707\
60	469	+	ZNF816\
376	465	+	TFAP2B\
477	463	-	ZNF460\
132	471	+	Prdm5\
201	469	+	TWIST1\
59	446	+	KLF14\
203	419	-	HAND2\
308	472	+	PBX1\

=== Tissue specificity ===
According to HumanAtlas, Geoprofile, and NCBI, TMEM61 is highly expressed in the Kidney, Pituitary gland, Salivary gland, Adrenal, and brain tissues in a decreasing order.

=== Embryonic development ===
In situ hybridization staining a mouse embryo discovered high levels of TMEM61 in Kidneys and found no other tissues to express the protein.

=== Immunochemistry ===
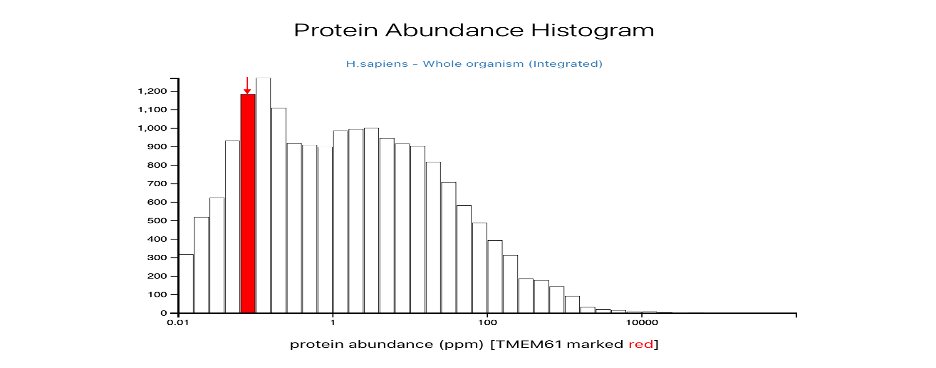
Immunochemistry of TMEM61 and expression in the Human body

TMEM61 was found to be very abundant in the human body in comparison to other proteins.

Western blotting showed an over expression of lysate in mammalian, in this case rabbit.

The staining of the human pancreas shows cytoplasmic positivity in exocrine cells.

== Interacting proteins ==
The IntAct, String, and BioGrid database found eight relevant interacting protein to the TMEM61. Other TMEM protein such as TMEM124 are closely monitored together for the cancer expression both in the same region but both did not promote cancer growth.

Interacting Protein	Interaction	Database	Publication notes
YAP1	K on 118 of the sequence In vitro direct interaction	BioGrID InTACT	Protein-peptide
HSPA2	Positive interaction via two hybrid array, pooling	INTACT	32814053 10.1016/j.celrep.2020.108050
TMEM45B	TMEM61 domain 2 region binding	String	PMID 34638224
FGFR3	Two hybrid array pooling, with physical association	INTACT	Interactome Mapping Provides a Network of Neurodegenerative Disease Proteins and Uncovers Widespread Protein Aggregation in Affected Brains
SARS1	Host organism: Saccharomyces cerevisiae (Baker's yeast), Neurodegeneration testing affiliation	INTACT	Interactome Mapping Provides a Network of Neurodegenerative Disease Proteins and Uncovers Widespread Protein Aggregation in Affected Brains^{[1]}
TMEM213	Interacts with TMEM61 second domain	String	PMID 34638224

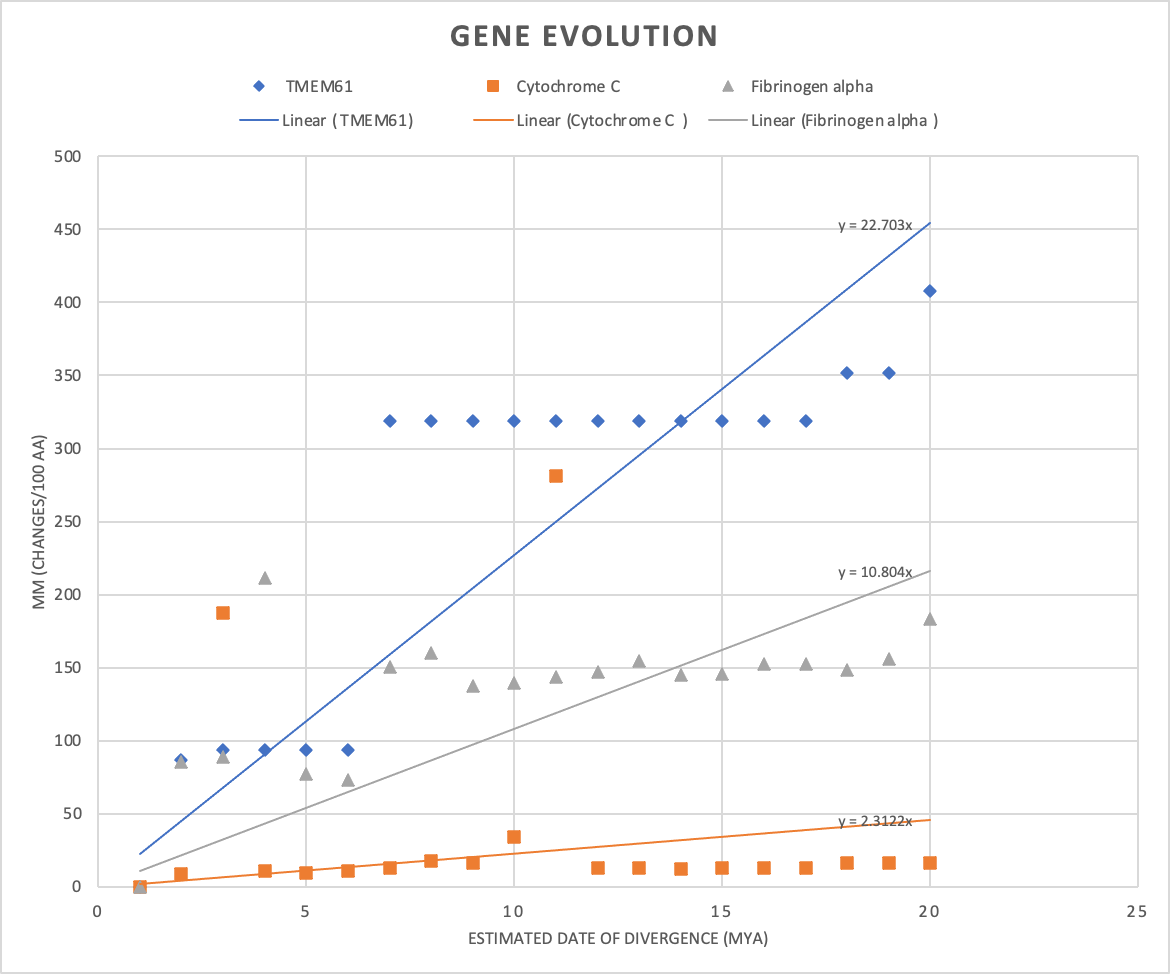
Protein evolution

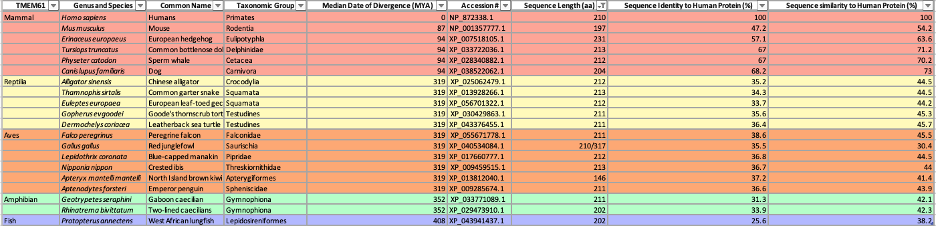
Orthologs of TMEM61

== Homology and evolution ==
=== Orthologs and paralogs ===
TMEM61 has orthologs in mammals, reptiles, aves, amphibians, and fish. A table of orthologs is beside to the right. There is no known paralog of TMEM61.

=== Evolutionary history ===
West African lungfish is the furthest-from-human known organism to express TMEM61 approximately 408 million years ago. The expression of TMEM61 protein throughout its closely related orthologs all indicate high expression in the Kidney.Based on a molecular clock analysis, the protein sequence of TMEM61 has on average evolved faster than Cytochrome C but slower than Fibrinogen alpha.

== Clinical significance ==
TMEM61 was anticipated to be associated with the formation of brain tumors but was later debunked as there was low levels expressed, however the test did indicate its location to be in the mitochondrial neural membrane region. The TMEM61 has been hoped to promote cancer or tumor growth but there has been no clinical research that proves this idea.

The information obtained about the TMEM61 does show expression on the kidney beyond it human organism and the studies show MIF limiting the expression of TMEM61.

The Aquaporin-11 deficiency, closing or breaking of water channels limits the protein expression in the membrane and restricts TMEM61 expression and inhibits kidney function.

=== Interacting proteins ===
Very close to other TMEM protein such as TMEM124 was closely monitored for the cancer expression both in the same region but both did not promote cancer growth. PMP22, YAP1.
