= Bainbridge–Ropers syndrome =

Human genetic disorder

- Other names: BRPS, ASXL3-Related Disorder, ASXL3 syndrome, Severe feeding difficulties-failure to thrive-microcephaly due to ASXL3 deficiency syndrome.
- Bainbridge-Ropers syndrome is inherited in an autosomal dominant manner.
- Specialty: Medical genetics
- Symptoms: Failure to thrive, feeding problems, hypotonia, Intellectual disability, Autism spectrum, postnatal growth delay, abnormal facial features such as arched eyebrows, anteverted nares, and Speech delay.
- Causes: Genetic mutation.

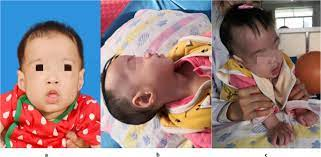
Child with Bainbridge–Ropers syndrome. Prominent forehead, protruding superior orbital crest, strabismus, nose unprecedentedly tilted, middle flat, lower lip eversion, and small jaw. Both hands were clawed, no clenched fists, wrists sagged, and both wrists slightly ulnar when laid flat.

Bainbridge–Ropers syndrome was first identified in 2013 and is characterized by failure to thrive, feeding problems, hypotonia, intellectual disabilities, autism, postnatal growth delay, abnormal facial features such as arched eyebrows, anteverted nares, and delays in language acquisition. BRPS is extremely rare worldwide; more than thirty cases of BRPS have been reported abroad, and four cases have been reported in China.

== Signs and symptoms ==
Morphological features of this syndrome include:

- Arched eyebrows
- Anteverted nares
- Ulnar deviation of the hands
- Microcephaly
- Skeletal abnormalities, such as a "barrel chest", extremely high arched palate
- Crowded teeth
- Hypertelorism (wide-set eyes)
- Scoliosis

== Genetics ==
This condition is caused by a mutation in the ASXL3 gene, which is considered a de novo mutation.

Genetic changes that are described as de novo (new) mutations can be either hereditary or somatic. In some cases, the mutation occurs in a person's egg or sperm cell but is not present in any of the person's other cells. In other cases, the mutation occurs in the fertilized egg shortly after the egg and sperm cells unite. (It is often impossible to tell exactly when a de novo mutation happened.) As the fertilized egg divides, each resulting cell in the growing embryo will have the mutation. De novo mutations may explain genetic disorders in which an affected child has a mutation in every cell in the body but the parents do not, and there is no family history of the disorder.

This condition is inheritable.

Mutations in the Additional Sex Combs Like 3 (ASXL3) gene on the long arm of chromosome 18 (18q12.1) have been associated with this condition.

== Diagnosis ==
The identification of a heterozygous pathogenic variant in ASXL3 by molecular genetic testing establishes the diagnosis of Bainbridge–Ropers syndrome.

=== Differential diagnosis ===
Bohring–Opitz syndrome

== Treatment ==
The majority of management is symptomatic and involves feeding therapy, the implantation of a gastrostomy tube for individuals with persistent feeding problems, anti-reflux medication and/or fundoplication for patients with gastroesophageal disease, standard treatment for joint contractures, epilepsy, sleep apnea, dental anomalies, strabismus and/or refractive error, and intellectual disability.

== History ==
This condition was first described by Bainbridge et al in 2013.
