= Bohring–Opitz syndrome =

- Other names: Oberklaid–Danks syndrome, C-like syndrome
- Specialty: Medical genetics
- Complications: obstructive apnea, Wilms tumor, lung infections, heart problems
- Usual onset: Congenital

Bohring–Opitz syndrome (BOS) is a genetic disorder caused by mutations in the ASXL1 gene.

== Presentation ==
This condition is characterised by craniofacial appearance, fixed contractures of the upper limbs, abnormal posture, feeding difficulties, intellectual disability, small size at birth and failure to thrive.

Children with BOS can also have recurring respiratory infections, silent aspiration, sleep apnea, developmental delay, abnormal hair density and length, Wilms' tumors, brain abnormalities, and other issues.

== Genetics ==
Genetically, de novo truncating mutations in ASXL1 have been shown to account for approximately 50% of Bohring–Opitz syndrome cases.

A second gene associated with this condition is the Kelch-like family member 7 (KLHL7).

== Diagnosis ==
As some of these features are shared with other genetic syndromes, the diagnosis is made by genetic testing.

== Epidemiology ==
The syndrome is extremely rare, with fewer than 80 reported cases worldwide.
