= FOXK1 =

Protein-coding gene in the species Homo sapiens

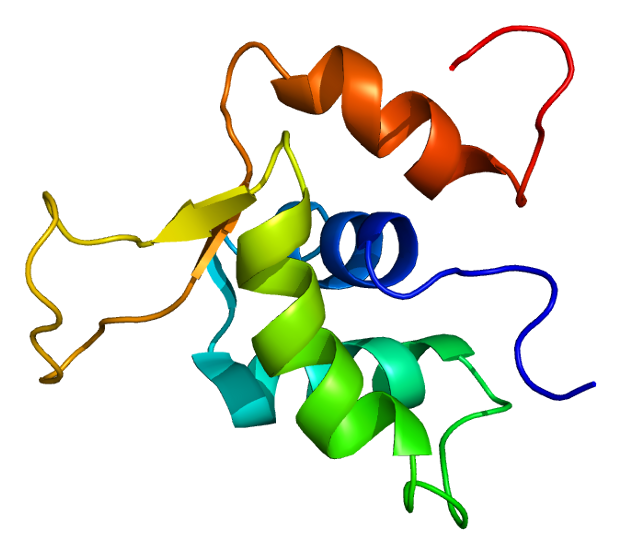

Identifiers
- Aliases: FOXK1, FOXK1L, forkhead box K1
- External IDs: OMIM: 616302; MGI: 1347488; GeneCards: FOXK1
Available structures
PDB	Ortholog search: PDBe RCSB
PDB	List of PDB id codes 2A3S, 2D2W

Gene location (Human)
Chr.	Chromosome 7 (human)
Band	7p22.1	Start	4,682,295 bp
Band	7p22.1	End	4,771,442 bp

Gene location (Mouse)
Chr.	Chromosome 5 (mouse)
Band	5 G2|5 81.53 cM	Start	142,387,252 bp
Band	5 G2|5 81.53 cM	End	142,447,766 bp
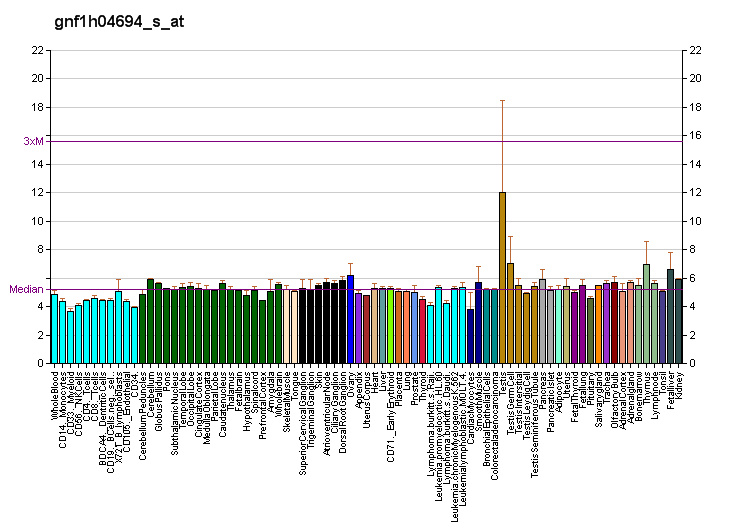

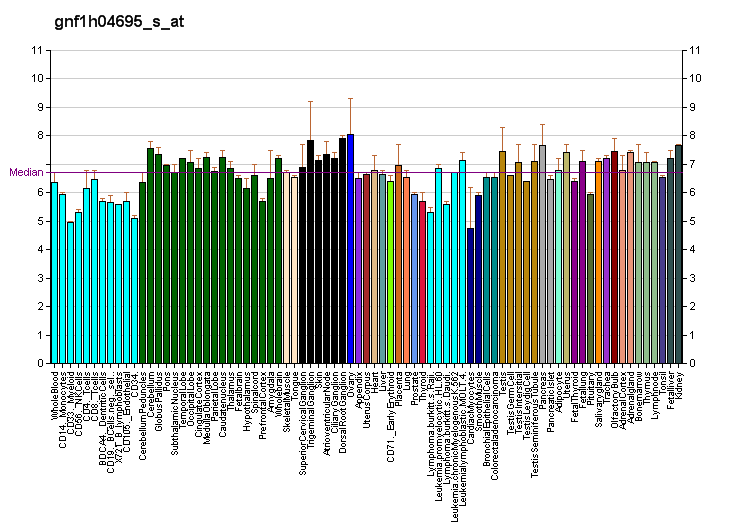
RNA expression pattern
Bgee	Human / Mouse (ortholog); Top expressed in: skin of arm; tendon of biceps brachii; cerebellar vermis; cardiac muscle tissue of right atrium; internal globus pallidus; pons; myocardium of left ventricle; middle temporal gyrus; superior vestibular nucleus; thalamus / Top expressed in: ascending aorta; aortic valve; Paneth cell; ciliary body; cumulus cell; gastrula; retinal pigment epithelium; supraoptic nucleus; secondary oocyte; primitive streak; More reference expression data
BioGPS	More reference expression data
Gene ontology
Molecular function	DNA-binding transcription factor activity; DNA binding; sequence-specific DNA binding; RNA polymerase II transcription regulatory region sequence-specific DNA binding; protein binding; DNA-binding transcription factor activity, RNA polymerase II-specific; transcription cis-regulatory region binding; DNA-binding transcription activator activity, RNA polymerase II-specific; DNA-binding transcription repressor activity, RNA polymerase II-specific
Cellular component	nucleus; nucleoplasm; cytoplasm
Biological process	regulation of transcription by RNA polymerase II; positive regulation of transcription, DNA-templated; multicellular organism development; muscle organ development; negative regulation of transcription, DNA-templated; regulation of transcription, DNA-templated; transcription, DNA-templated; protein deubiquitination; anatomical structure morphogenesis; cell differentiation; negative regulation of transcription by RNA polymerase II; positive regulation of transcription by RNA polymerase II
Sources:Amigo / QuickGO
Orthologs
Databases	NCBI: entry; OMA: entry
Species	Human	Mouse
Entrez	221937	17425
Ensembl	ENSG00000164916	ENSMUSG00000056493
UniProt	P85037	P42128
RefSeq (mRNA)	NM_001037165	NM_010812; NM_199068
RefSeq (protein)	NP_001032242	NP_951031
Location (UCSC)	Chr 7: 4.68 – 4.77 Mb	Chr 5: 142.39 – 142.45 Mb
PubMed search
- Wikidata
View/Edit Human	View/Edit Mouse

Forkhead box protein K1 is a transcription factor of the forkhead box family that in humans is encoded by the FOXK1 gene.

During starvation, in type 2 diabetes, in rapidly dividing cells during embryogenesis, in tumors (Warburg effect) and during T cell proliferation, aerobic glycolysis is induced to produce the building block to sustain growth. FOXK1 is one of the transcription factors managing the passage from the normal cellular respiration (complete glucose oxidation) to generating ATP and intermediaries for many other biochemical pathways.

FOXK1 and its closely relate sibling FOXK2 induce aerobic glycolysis by upregulating the enzymatic machinery required for this (for example, hexokinase-2, phosphofructokinase, pyruvate kinase, and lactate dehydrogenase), while at the same time suppressing further oxidation of pyruvate in the mitochondria by increasing the activity of pyruvate dehydrogenase kinases 1 and 4. Together with suppression of the catalytic subunit of pyruvate dehydrogenase phosphatase 1 this leads to increased phosphorylation of the E1α regulatory subunit of the pyruvate dehydrogenase complex, which in turn inhibits further oxidation of pyruvate in the mitochondria—instead, pyruvate is reduced to lactate. Suppression of FOXK1 and FOXK2 induce the opposite phenotype. Both in vitro and in vivo experiments, including studies of primary human cells, show how FOXK1 and/or FOXK2 are likely to act as important regulators that reprogram cellular metabolism to induce aerobic glycolysis.
