= PDCD2 =

Protein-coding gene in the species Homo sapiens

Identifiers
- Aliases: PDCD2, RP8, ZMYND7, programmed cell death 2
- External IDs: OMIM: 600866; MGI: 104643; GeneCards: PDCD2

Gene location (Human)
Chr.	Chromosome 6 (human)
Band	6q27	Start	170,575,295 bp
Band	6q27	End	170,584,692 bp

Gene location (Mouse)
Chr.	Chromosome 17 (mouse)
Band	17 A2|17 8.95 cM	Start	15,739,470 bp
Band	17 A2|17 8.95 cM	End	15,747,563 bp
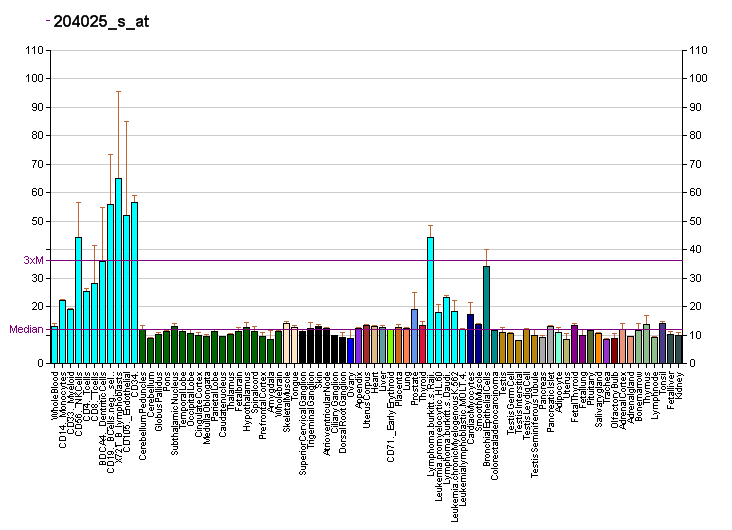
RNA expression pattern
Bgee	Human / Mouse (ortholog); Top expressed in: gonad; body of pancreas; rectum; granulocyte; Achilles tendon; body of stomach; monocyte; right coronary artery; ganglionic eminence; islet of Langerhans / Top expressed in: tail of embryo; fossa; primitive streak; epiblast; facial motor nucleus; genital tubercle; condyle; medial ganglionic eminence; embryo; embryo; More reference expression data
BioGPS	More reference expression data
Gene ontology
Molecular function	enzyme binding; DNA binding; protein binding; metal ion binding
Cellular component	cytoplasm; extracellular exosome; nucleus
Biological process	positive regulation of apoptotic process; positive regulation of hematopoietic stem cell proliferation; regulation of hematopoietic progenitor cell differentiation; activation of cysteine-type endopeptidase activity involved in apoptotic process; programmed cell death; apoptotic process
Sources:Amigo / QuickGO
Orthologs
Databases	NCBI: entry; OMA: entry
Species	Human	Mouse
Entrez	5134	18567
Ensembl	ENSG00000071994	ENSMUSG00000014771
UniProt	Q16342	P46718
RefSeq (mRNA)	NM_001199461; NM_001199462; NM_001199463; NM_001199464; NM_002598 NM_144781; NM_001363655	NM_008799
RefSeq (protein)	NP_001186390; NP_001186391; NP_001186392; NP_001186393; NP_002589 NP_659005; NP_001350584	NP_032825
Location (UCSC)	Chr 6: 170.58 – 170.58 Mb	Chr 17: 15.74 – 15.75 Mb
PubMed search
- Wikidata
View/Edit Human	View/Edit Mouse

Programmed cell death protein 2 is a protein that in humans is encoded by the PDCD2 gene.

== Function ==
This gene encodes a nuclear protein expressed in a variety of tissues. The rat homolog, Rp8, is transiently expressed in immature thymocytes and is thought to be involved in programmed cell death. Expression of the human gene has been shown to be repressed by BCL6, a transcriptional repressor required for lymph node germinal center development, suggesting that BCL6 regulates apoptosis by its effects on PDCD2. This gene is closely linked on chromosome 6 to the gene for TBP, the TATA binding protein. Six transcripts encoding different proteins have been identified.

== Interactions ==
PDCD2 has been shown to interact with Host cell factor C1 and Parkin (ligase).
