= GABPA =

Protein-coding gene in the species Homo sapiens

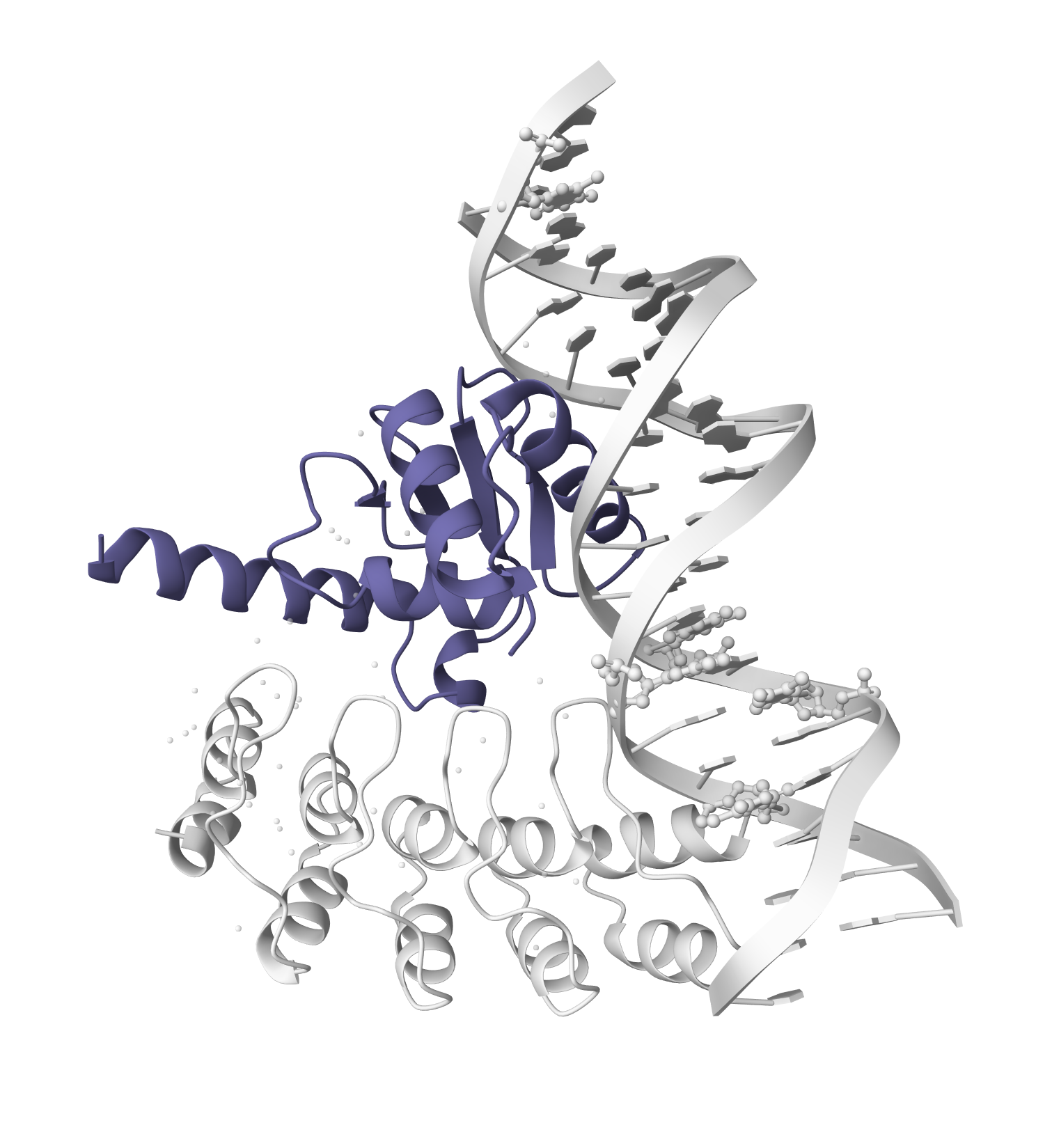

Identifiers
- Aliases: GABPA, E4TF1-60, E4TF1A, NFT2, NRF2, NRF2A, RCH04A07, GA binding protein transcription factor alpha subunit, GA binding protein transcription factor subunit alpha
- External IDs: OMIM: 600609; MGI: 95610; GeneCards: GABPA
Available structures
PDB	Ortholog search: PDBe RCSB
PDB	List of PDB id codes 1AWC, 1SXD, 2JUO

Gene location (Human)
Chr.	Chromosome 21 (human)
Band	21q21.3	Start	25,734,570 bp
Band	21q21.3	End	25,772,460 bp

Gene location (Mouse)
Chr.	Chromosome 16 (mouse)
Band	16 C3.3|16 46.92 cM	Start	84,631,813 bp
Band	16 C3.3|16 46.92 cM	End	84,660,667 bp
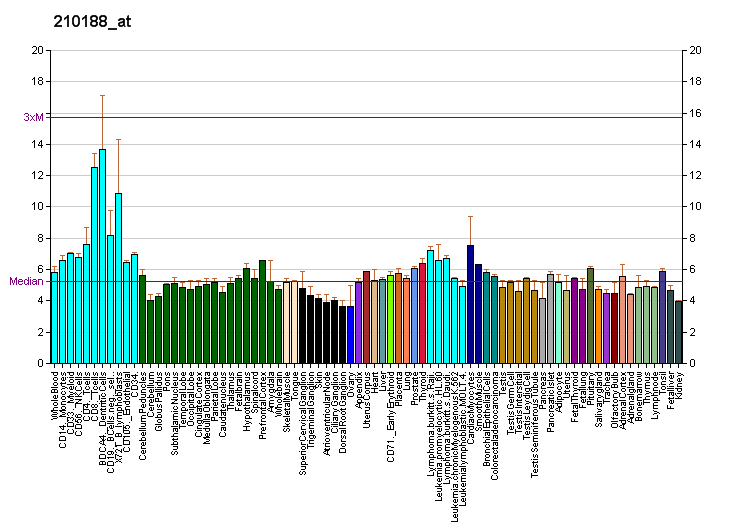
RNA expression pattern
Bgee	Human / Mouse (ortholog); Top expressed in: Achilles tendon; ventricular zone; ganglionic eminence; thymus; skin of arm; synovial membrane; gonad; smooth muscle tissue; synovial joint; germinal epithelium / Top expressed in: genital tubercle; tail of embryo; Paneth cell; dermis; abdominal wall; migratory enteric neural crest cell; atrioventricular valve; vas deferens; left lung lobe; Gonadal ridge; More reference expression data
BioGPS	More reference expression data
Gene ontology
Molecular function	DNA binding; sequence-specific DNA binding; DNA-binding transcription factor activity; DNA-binding transcription activator activity, RNA polymerase II-specific; transcription coactivator activity; chromatin binding; RNA polymerase II cis-regulatory region sequence-specific DNA binding; protein binding; protein heterodimerization activity; DNA-binding transcription factor activity, RNA polymerase II-specific
Cellular component	nucleoplasm; nucleus
Biological process	cell differentiation; regulation of transcription, DNA-templated; regulation of transcription by RNA polymerase II; mitochondrion organization; in utero embryonic development; negative regulation of transcription by RNA polymerase II; negative regulation of megakaryocyte differentiation; transcription, DNA-templated; positive regulation of transcription by RNA polymerase II; transcription by RNA polymerase II; positive regulation of gene expression; cellular response to dopamine; blastocyst formation
Sources:Amigo / QuickGO
Orthologs
Databases	NCBI: entry; OMA: entry
Species	Human	Mouse
Entrez	2551	14390
Ensembl	ENSG00000154727	ENSMUSG00000008976
UniProt	Q06546; Q8IYS3	Q00422
RefSeq (mRNA)	NM_001197297; NM_002040	NM_008065
RefSeq (protein)	NP_001184226; NP_002031; NP_002031.2	NP_032091
Location (UCSC)	Chr 21: 25.73 – 25.77 Mb	Chr 16: 84.63 – 84.66 Mb
PubMed search
- Wikidata
View/Edit Human	View/Edit Mouse

GA-binding protein alpha chain is a protein that in humans is encoded by the GABPA gene.

== Function ==
This gene encodes one of three GA-binding protein transcription factor subunits which functions as a DNA-binding subunit. Since this subunit shares identity with a subunit encoding the nuclear respiratory factor 2 gene, it is likely involved in activation of cytochrome c oxidase expression and nuclear control of mitochondrial function. This subunit also shares identity with a subunit constituting the transcription factor E4TF1, responsible for expression of the adenovirus E4 gene. Because of its chromosomal localization and ability to form heterodimers with other polypeptides, this gene may play a role in the Down syndrome phenotype.

== Interactions ==
GABPA has been shown to interact with Host cell factor C1, Sp1 transcription factor and Sp3 transcription factor.

== See also ==
- ETS transcription factor family
- GABPB2
