= SIN3B =

Protein-coding gene in the species Homo sapiens

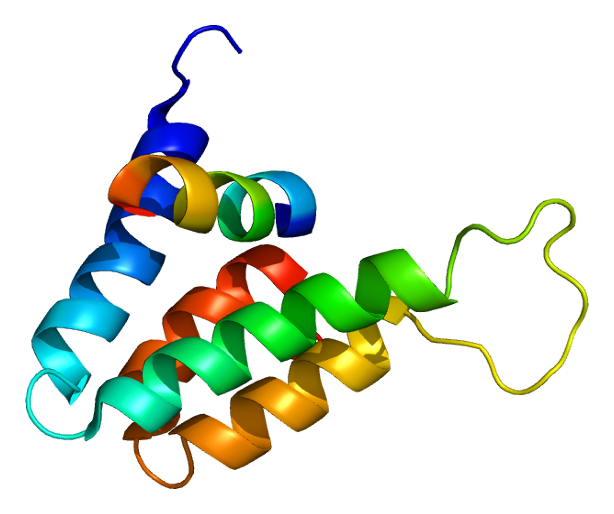

Identifiers
- Aliases: SIN3B, Paired amphipathic helix protein Sin3b, SIN3 transcription regulator family member B
- External IDs: OMIM: 607777; MGI: 107158; GeneCards: SIN3B
Available structures
PDB	Ortholog search: PDBe RCSB
PDB	List of PDB id codes 1E91, 1PD7, 2CR7, 2CZY, 2F05

Gene location (Human)
Chr.	Chromosome 19 (human)
Band	19p13.11	Start	16,829,398 bp
Band	19p13.11	End	16,880,353 bp

Gene location (Mouse)
Chr.	Chromosome 8 (mouse)
Band	8 B3.3|8 35.08 cM	Start	73,449,913 bp
Band	8 B3.3|8 35.08 cM	End	73,484,829 bp
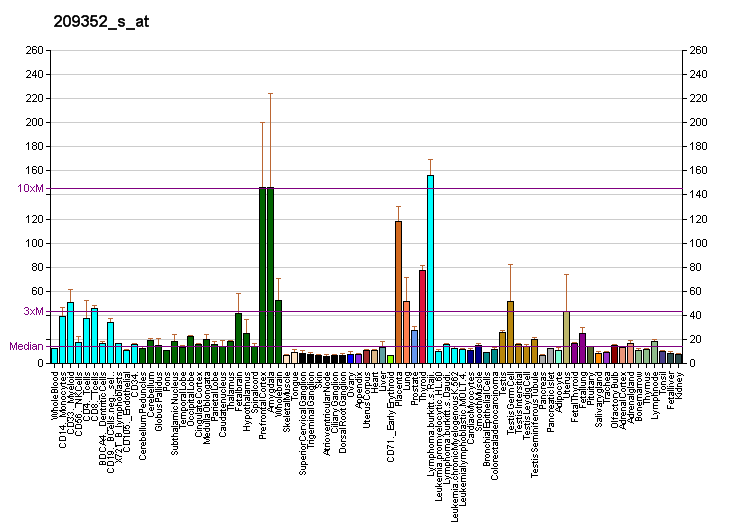

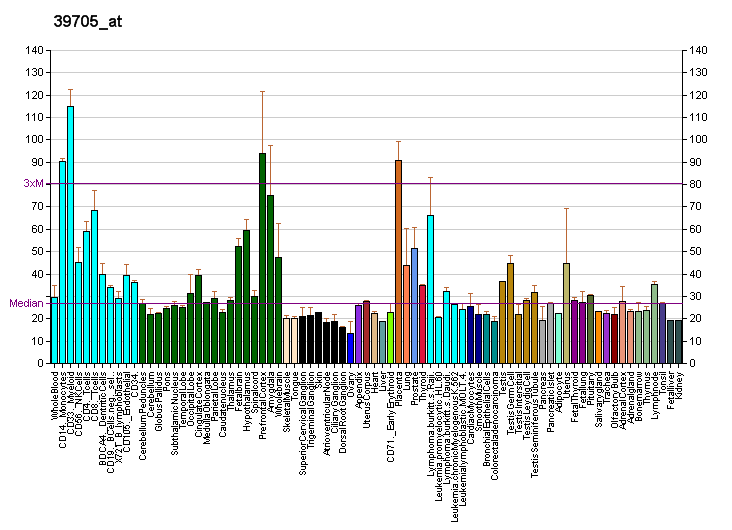
RNA expression pattern
Bgee	Human / Mouse (ortholog); Top expressed in: body of uterus; right uterine tube; right ovary; left ovary; canal of the cervix; right lung; gastric mucosa; left uterine tube; left testis; sural nerve / Top expressed in: Gonadal ridge; Paneth cell; internal carotid artery; external carotid artery; fossa; renal corpuscle; epithelium of lens; condyle; endocardial cushion; medullary collecting duct; More reference expression data
BioGPS	More reference expression data
Gene ontology
Molecular function	transcription corepressor activity; histone deacetylase activity; chromatin binding; protein binding
Cellular component	cytoplasm; X chromosome; Y chromosome; autosome; Sin3 complex; nucleoplasm; XY body; nucleus; chromatin
Biological process	regulation of transcription, DNA-templated; negative regulation of transcription by RNA polymerase II; transcription, DNA-templated; negative regulation of transcription, DNA-templated; histone deacetylation; regulation of lipid metabolic process
Sources:Amigo / QuickGO
Orthologs
Databases	NCBI: entry; OMA: entry
Species	Human	Mouse
Entrez	23309	20467
Ensembl	ENSG00000127511	ENSMUSG00000031622
UniProt	O75182	Q62141
RefSeq (mRNA)	NM_001297595; NM_001297597; NM_015260	NM_001113248; NM_009188
RefSeq (protein)	NP_001284524; NP_001284526; NP_056075	NP_001106719; NP_033214
Location (UCSC)	Chr 19: 16.83 – 16.88 Mb	Chr 8: 73.45 – 73.48 Mb
PubMed search
- Wikidata
View/Edit Human	View/Edit Mouse

Paired amphipathic helix protein Sin3b is a protein that in human beings is encoded by the SIN3B gene.

== Interactions ==
SIN3B has been shown to interact with HDAC1, Zinc finger and BTB domain-containing protein 16, SUDS3 and IKZF1.

== See also ==
- Transcription coregulator
