= ASXL3 =

Protein-coding gene in humans

Identifiers
- Aliases: ASXL3, BRPS, KIAA1713, additional sex combs like 3, transcriptional regulator, ASXL transcriptional regulator 3
- External IDs: OMIM: 615115; MGI: 2685175; HomoloGene: 19371; GeneCards: ASXL3; OMA:ASXL3 - orthologs

Gene location (Human)
Chr.	Chromosome 18 (human)
Band	18q12.1	Start	33,578,219 bp
Band	18q12.1	End	33,751,195 bp

Gene location (Mouse)
Chr.	Chromosome 18 (mouse)
Band	18|18 A2	Start	22,477,303 bp
Band	18|18 A2	End	22,663,284 bp
RNA expression pattern
Bgee	Human / Mouse (ortholog); Top expressed in: buccal mucosa cell; secondary oocyte; sperm; testicle; ganglionic eminence; Brodmann area 23; middle temporal gyrus; sural nerve; endothelial cell; ventricular zone / Top expressed in: superior cervical ganglion; Rostral migratory stream; hand; trigeminal ganglion; genital tubercle; maxillary prominence; otolith organ; mandibular prominence; utricle; ganglionic eminence; More reference expression data
BioGPS	n/a
Gene ontology
Molecular function	metal ion binding; DNA binding; chromatin binding; peroxisome proliferator activated receptor binding
Cellular component	nucleus; PR-DUB complex
Biological process	regulation of transcription, DNA-templated; transcription, DNA-templated; animal organ morphogenesis; positive regulation of transcription by RNA polymerase II
Sources:Amigo / QuickGO
Orthologs
Species	Human	Mouse
Entrez	80816	211961
Ensembl	ENSG00000141431	ENSMUSG00000045215
UniProt	Q9C0F0	Q8C4A5
RefSeq (mRNA)	NM_030632	NM_001167777
RefSeq (protein)	NP_085135	NP_001161249
Location (UCSC)	Chr 18: 33.58 – 33.75 Mb	Chr 18: 22.48 – 22.66 Mb
PubMed search
- Wikidata
View/Edit Human	View/Edit Mouse

Putative Polycomb group protein ASXL3 is a protein that in humans is encoded by the ASXL3 gene.

== See also ==
- Bainbridge–Ropers syndrome
- Polycomb-group proteins
- ASXL1
- ASXL2
