= Host cell factor C1 =

Protein-coding gene in the species Homo sapiens

HCFC1

Identifiers
- Aliases: HCFC1, CFF, HCF-1, HCF1, HFC1, MRX3, PPP1R89, VCAF, HCF, Host cell factor C1, XLID3, MAHCX
- External IDs: OMIM: 300019; MGI: 105942; GeneCards: HCFC1
Available structures
PDB	Ortholog search: PDBe RCSB
PDB	List of PDB id codes 4GO6, 4N39, 4N3A, 4N3B, 4N3C

Gene location (Human)
Chr.	X chromosome (human)
Band	Xq28	Start	153,947,557 bp
Band	Xq28	End	153,971,818 bp

Gene location (Mouse)
Chr.	X chromosome (mouse)
Band	X A7.3|X 37.52 cM	Start	72,986,398 bp
Band	X A7.3|X 37.52 cM	End	73,009,963 bp
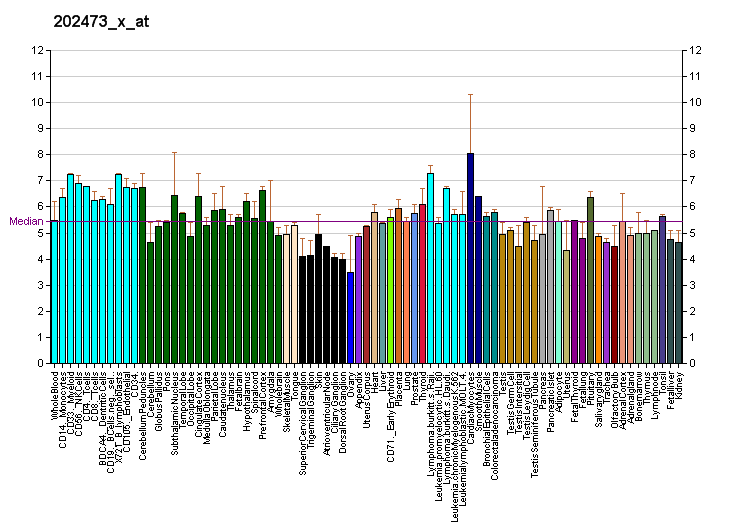

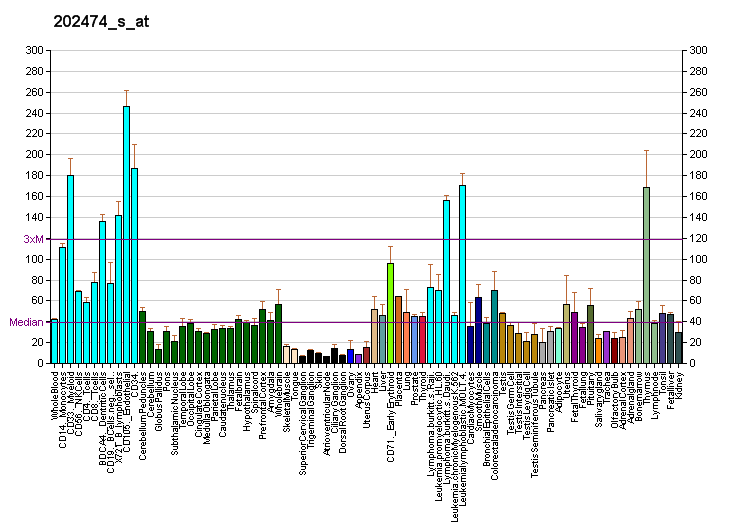
RNA expression pattern
Bgee	Human / Mouse (ortholog); Top expressed in: tendon of biceps brachii; parotid gland; Skeletal muscle tissue of rectus abdominis; ganglionic eminence; anterior pituitary; nipple; ventricular zone; body of uterus; pylorus; apex of heart / Top expressed in: genital tubercle; tail of embryo; epiblast; ventricular zone; mandibular prominence; thymus; ganglionic eminence; fetal liver hematopoietic progenitor cell; maxillary prominence; somite; More reference expression data
BioGPS	More reference expression data
Gene ontology
Molecular function	DNA-binding transcription factor activity; transcription coactivator activity; chromatin binding; histone acetyltransferase activity (H4-K8 specific); histone acetyltransferase activity (H4-K5 specific); DNA-binding transcription activator activity, RNA polymerase II-specific; protein binding; identical protein binding; histone acetyltransferase activity (H4-K16 specific); cadherin binding; protein-macromolecule adaptor activity; sequence-specific double-stranded DNA binding
Cellular component	cytoplasm; membrane; SAGA-type complex; Set1C/COMPASS complex; axon; soma; MLL1 complex; dendrite; histone acetyltransferase complex; nucleus; nucleoplasm; protein-containing complex
Biological process	regulation of transcription, DNA-templated; release from viral latency; cellular response to organic cyclic compound; protein stabilization; mitochondrion organization; negative regulation of transcription by RNA polymerase II; histone H4-K5 acetylation; positive regulation of gene expression; positive regulation of cell cycle; cell cycle; histone H4-K16 acetylation; viral process; histone H4-K8 acetylation; regulation of protein-containing complex assembly; positive regulation of transcription by RNA polymerase II; transcription by RNA polymerase II; protein deubiquitination; blastocyst hatching; chromatin organization; positive regulation of transcription, DNA-templated
Sources:Amigo / QuickGO
Orthologs
Databases	NCBI: entry; OMA: entry
Species	Human	Mouse
Entrez	3054	15161
Ensembl	ENSG00000172534	ENSMUSG00000031386
UniProt	P51610	Q61191
RefSeq (mRNA)	NM_005334	NM_008224
RefSeq (protein)	NP_005325	NP_032250
Location (UCSC)	Chr X: 153.95 – 153.97 Mb	Chr X: 72.99 – 73.01 Mb
PubMed search
- Wikidata
View/Edit Human	View/Edit Mouse

Host cell factor 1 (HCFC1, HCF1, or HCF-1), also known as VP16-accessory protein, is a protein that in humans is encoded by the HCFC1 gene.

== Structure ==
HCF1 is a member of the highly conserved host cell factor family and encodes a protein with five Kelch repeats, a fibronectin-like motif, and six HCF repeats, each of which contains a highly specific cleavage signal. This nuclear transcription coregulator is proteolytically cleaved at one or more of the six possible sites, resulting in the creation of an N-terminal chain and the corresponding C-terminal chain. The final form of this protein consists of noncovalently bound N- and C-terminal chains which interact through electrostatic forces.

== Function ==
HCF1 is involved in control of the cell cycle as well as having regulatory roles in a multitude of processes related to transcription. Additionally, work in model organisms point to HCF1 as being a putative longevity determinant. Alternatively spliced variants that encode different protein isoforms have been described; however, not all variants have been fully characterized.

Mutations in this gene have been linked to disorders of the cobalamine metabolism.

== Interactions ==
Host cell factor C1 has been shown to interact with:

- BAP1,
- CREB3,
- GABPA,
- HDAC1,
- HDAC2,
- MLL,
- OGT,
- PDCD2,
- POU2F1,
- PPP1CA,
- SIN3A,
- SP1,
- SUDS3,
- WDR5, and
- ZBTB17.
