= Transcription factor Sp3 =

Protein-coding gene in the species Homo sapiens

SP3
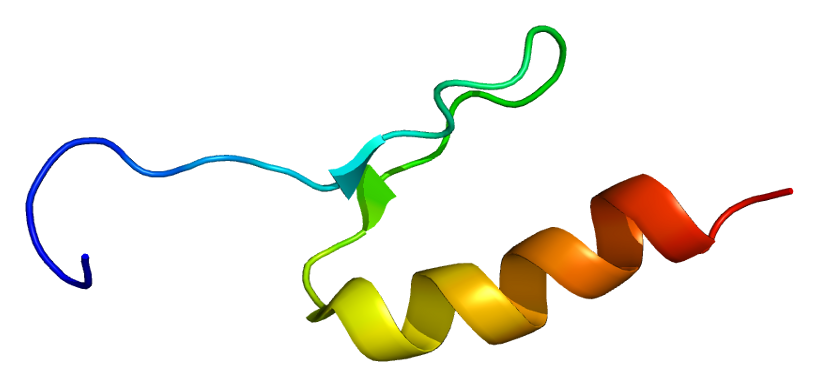

Identifiers
- Aliases: SP3, SPR2, Sp3 transcription factor
- External IDs: OMIM: 601804; MGI: 1277166; GeneCards: SP3

Gene location (Human)
Chr.	Chromosome 2 (human)
Band	2q31.1	Start	173,880,850 bp
Band	2q31.1	End	173,965,373 bp

Gene location (Mouse)
Chr.	Chromosome 2 (mouse)
Band	2|2 C3	Start	72,766,771 bp
Band	2|2 C3	End	72,810,790 bp
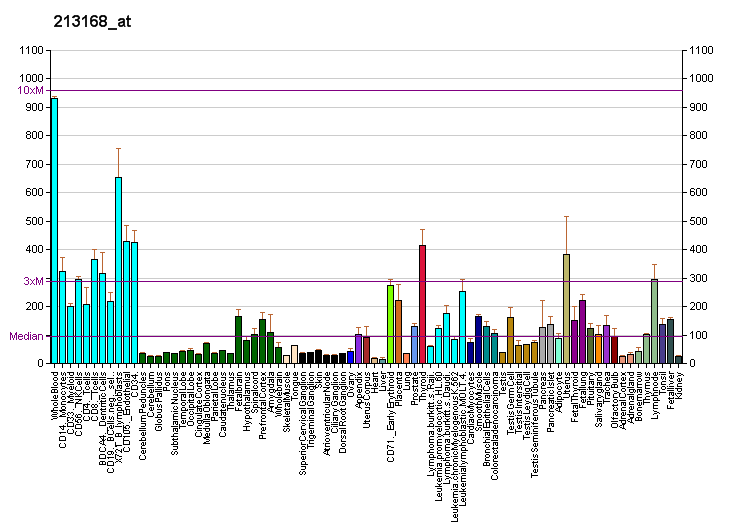
RNA expression pattern
Bgee	Human / Mouse (ortholog); Top expressed in: hair follicle; germinal epithelium; sural nerve; superficial temporal artery; mucosa of paranasal sinus; Achilles tendon; buccal mucosa cell; skin of hip; palpebral conjunctiva; ventricular zone / Top expressed in: granulocyte; genital tubercle; left lung lobe; migratory enteric neural crest cell; hand; thymus; atrium; dermis; left colon; ciliary body; More reference expression data
BioGPS	More reference expression data
Gene ontology
Molecular function	DNA binding; chromatin binding; cis-regulatory region sequence-specific DNA binding; metal ion binding; DNA-binding transcription repressor activity, RNA polymerase II-specific; protein binding; nucleic acid binding; DNA-binding transcription factor activity, RNA polymerase II-specific; double-stranded DNA binding; DNA-binding transcription factor activity; RNA polymerase II transcription regulatory region sequence-specific DNA binding; RNA polymerase II cis-regulatory region sequence-specific DNA binding
Cellular component	PML body; transcription repressor complex; nucleus; nucleoplasm; protein-DNA complex
Biological process	megakaryocyte differentiation; regulation of transcription, DNA-templated; ossification; lung development; embryonic placenta development; in utero embryonic development; negative regulation of transcription by RNA polymerase II; monocyte differentiation; protein sumoylation; transcription, DNA-templated; embryonic skeletal system development; positive regulation of transcription, DNA-templated; embryonic process involved in female pregnancy; T cell differentiation; granulocyte differentiation; embryonic camera-type eye morphogenesis; trophectodermal cell differentiation; enucleate erythrocyte differentiation; erythrocyte differentiation; definitive hemopoiesis; liver development; B cell differentiation; negative regulation of transcription, DNA-templated; positive regulation of transcription by RNA polymerase II; natural killer cell differentiation; regulation of transcription by RNA polymerase II
Sources:Amigo / QuickGO
Orthologs
Databases	NCBI: entry; OMA: entry
Species	Human	Mouse
Entrez	6670	20687
Ensembl	ENSG00000172845	ENSMUSG00000027109
UniProt	Q02447; Q86TP0	O70494
RefSeq (mRNA)	NM_003111; NM_001017371; NM_001172712	NM_001018042; NM_001098425; NM_011450
RefSeq (protein)	NP_001017371; NP_001166183; NP_003102; NP_003102.1	NP_001018052; NP_001091895
Location (UCSC)	Chr 2: 173.88 – 173.97 Mb	Chr 2: 72.77 – 72.81 Mb
PubMed search
- Wikidata
View/Edit Human	View/Edit Mouse

Transcription factor Sp3 is a protein that in humans is encoded by the SP3 gene.

This gene belongs to a family of Sp1 related genes that encode transcription factors that regulate transcription by binding to consensus GC- and GT-box regulatory elements in target genes. This protein contains a zinc finger DNA-binding domain and several transactivation domains, and has been reported to function as a bifunctional transcription factor that either stimulates or represses the transcription of numerous genes. Transcript variants encoding different isoforms have been described for this gene, and one has been reported to initiate translation from a non-AUG (AUA) start codon. Additional isoforms, resulting from the use of alternate downstream translation initiation sites, have also been noted.

== Interactions ==
Transcription factor Sp3 has been shown to interact with Histone deacetylase 2, PIAS1, E2F1 and GABPA.
