= Chopra–Amiel–Gordon syndrome =

Rare neurodevelopmental disorder

- Other names: ANKRD17-related neurodevelopmental syndrome, CAGS
- Specialty: Medical genetics, neurology
- Symptoms: Developmental delay, speech delay, intellectual disability, dysmorphic facial features, epilepsy, ophthalmologic abnormalities, recurrent infections
- Usual onset: Infancy
- Causes: Pathogenic variants in ANKRD17 (autosomal dominant)
- Risk factors: Mostly de novo; some familial cases
- Diagnostic method: Clinical evaluation and confirmatory genetic testing
- Treatment: Supportive and symptomatic management (multidisciplinary care)
- Prognosis: Variable; quality of life depends on symptom severity
- Frequency: <1 in 1 million

Chopra–Amiel–Gordon syndrome (CAGS), also called ANKRD17‑related neurodevelopmental syndrome, is an ultra-rare genetic disorder characterized by developmental delay and variable intellectual disability, particularly affecting speech. It is caused by autosomal dominant loss‑of‑function variants of the ANKRD17 gene on chromosome 4, which encodes ankyrin repeat domain‑containing protein 17. The syndrome was first delineated in 2021 by researchers Maya Chopra, Jeanne Amiel and Christopher T. Gordon, after whom it is named.

== Signs and symptoms ==
The clinical presentation of CAGS is variable. Affected individuals typically have global developmental delay and/or intellectual disability, often with a severe speech delay. Many individuals exhibit distinctive craniofacial features such as a triangular or elongated face, high anterior hairline, almond‑shaped or deep‑set eyes, full cheeks, thick nasal alae with flared nostrils, thin upper vermilion, and low‑set ears. Less common facial findings include cleft palate, Pierre Robin sequence and scoliosis. Motor development may be delayed, and hypotonia and gait or balance difficulties are frequent. Many affected individuals have epilepsy (often absence seizures), behavioural issues such as autism spectrum disorder or ADHD, and ophthalmologic abnormalities including strabismus, refractive errors and microphthalmia. Growth impairment, feeding difficulties and recurrent bacterial or viral infections are also reported. Joint hypermobility, hypotonia and kidney anomalies have been documented, and at least one case of ruptured cerebrovascular aneurysm in the neonatal period has been reported. Clinical severity ranges from mild to profound, and some individuals are capable of independent living while others require lifelong support.

== Genetics and pathophysiology ==
CAGS results from heterozygous loss‑of‑function variants in ANKRD17 (NM_032217.4), located on chromosome 4q13. The gene encodes ankyrin repeat domain‑containing protein 17, which contains multiple ankyrin repeat domains involved in protein–protein interactions. Experimental ablation of Ankrd17 in mice causes embryonic lethality due to cardiovascular defects and severe haemorrhages, demonstrating that the protein is essential for vascular maturation and the development of vascular smooth muscle cells. The mechanism by which loss of ANKRD17 function leads to the human neurodevelopmental phenotype remains unclear, but it may relate to the gene's roles in signal transduction, transcriptional regulation and cytoskeletal organisation. Because the gene is located on an autosome, CAGS follows an autosomal dominant inheritance pattern; only one pathogenic allele is needed to manifest the condition. The majority of reported variants are de novo; however, familial transmission with parent‑to‑child inheritance has been documented.

== Diagnosis ==
Diagnosis is based on recognition of the characteristic clinical features and confirmation of a pathogenic variant in ANKRD17. Genetic testing typically involves exome or genome sequencing, a targeted gene panel, or a chromosome microarray capable of detecting single‑nucleotide variants and larger deletions encompassing ANKRD17. As the phenotype overlaps with other neurodevelopmental disorders and syndromes, differential diagnosis includes conditions such as Down syndrome, Pierre Robin sequence and other ANKRD‑related disorders. Brain imaging often shows non‑specific findings such as decreased white‑matter volume, focal hyperintensities or sclerosis, and EEG may reveal epileptiform activity.

== Management ==
There is no curative therapy for CAGS; management is supportive and tailored to the individual's clinical needs. Seizures are treated with anti‑seizure medications. Developmental and behavioural interventions, including physical, occupational and speech therapy, are recommended, and many individuals benefit from augmentative and alternative communication devices. Routine ophthalmologic examinations, renal ultrasound and immunological evaluation are advised because of the frequency of eye anomalies, kidney abnormalities and recurrent infections. Genetic counselling should be offered to affected individuals and their families, and a multidisciplinary team—including neurologists, geneticists, speech therapists, ophthalmologists and occupational therapists—is typically involved in care.

== Epidemiology ==
CAGS is extremely rare. Fewer than forty individuals had been reported in the medical literature as of 2023, but improved genetic testing and outreach have led to a growing number of diagnoses. The CAGS Foundation reports that over 100 individuals worldwide had received a diagnosis by 2025, though many cases may be undiagnosed. Both sexes are affected equally because the responsible gene is autosomal.

== Research and advocacy ==
Natural history studies are underway to delineate the full clinical spectrum and long‑term outcomes of CAGS. The Chopra–Amiel–Gordon Syndrome Foundation, a nonprofit founded by families, connects affected individuals with researchers and clinicians and raises awareness of the condition. A natural history study coordinated by Boston Children's Hospital and Harvard Medical School is recruiting individuals with confirmed or suspected CAGS to better understand the disorder and develop targeted therapies.

== See also ==
- Genetic disorder
- Developmental disability
