= SUDS3 =

Protein-coding gene in the species Homo sapiens

Identifiers
- Aliases: SUDS3, SAP45, SDS3, SDS3 homolog, SIN3A corepressor complex component
- External IDs: OMIM: 608250; MGI: 1919204; GeneCards: SUDS3
Available structures
PDB	Ortholog search: PDBe RCSB
PDB	List of PDB id codes 2N2H, 4ZQA

Gene location (Human)
Chr.	Chromosome 12 (human)
Band	12q24.23	Start	118,376,555 bp
Band	12q24.23	End	118,418,033 bp

Gene location (Mouse)
Chr.	Chromosome 5 (mouse)
Band	5|5 F	Start	117,229,745 bp
Band	5|5 F	End	117,254,178 bp
RNA expression pattern
Bgee	Human / Mouse (ortholog); Top expressed in: secondary oocyte; buccal mucosa cell; palpebral conjunctiva; pancreatic epithelial cell; epithelium of colon; parotid gland; skin of arm; tonsil; germinal epithelium; bone marrow cell / Top expressed in: spermatid; spermatocyte; saccule; neural layer of retina; blood; otic placode; otic vesicle; granulocyte; lens; lip; More reference expression data
BioGPS	n/a
Gene ontology
Molecular function	histone deacetylase binding; protein binding; enzyme binding; histone deacetylase activity
Cellular component	Sin3 complex; nucleoplasm; Sin3-type complex; nucleus; cytosol; nuclear body
Biological process	regulation of transcription, DNA-templated; substantia nigra development; negative regulation of transcription by RNA polymerase II; transcription, DNA-templated; positive regulation of apoptotic process; negative regulation of transcription, DNA-templated; histone deacetylation; apoptotic process; protein deubiquitination; chromatin organization
Sources:Amigo / QuickGO
Orthologs
Databases	NCBI: entry; OMA: entry
Species	Human	Mouse
Entrez	64426	71954
Ensembl	ENSG00000111707	ENSMUSG00000066900
UniProt	Q9H7L9	Q8BR65
RefSeq (mRNA)	NM_022491	NM_001122666; NM_178622
RefSeq (protein)	NP_071936	NP_001116138; NP_848737
Location (UCSC)	Chr 12: 118.38 – 118.42 Mb	Chr 5: 117.23 – 117.25 Mb
PubMed search
- Wikidata
View/Edit Human	View/Edit Mouse

Sin3 histone deacetylase corepressor complex component SDS3 is an enzyme that in humans is encoded by the SUDS3 gene.

== Function ==
SDS3 is a subunit of the histone deacetylase (see HDAC1; MIM 601241)-dependent SIN3A (MIM 607776) corepressor complex (Fleischer et al., 2003).[supplied by OMIM]

== Interactions ==
SUDS3 has been shown to interact with HDAC1, Host cell factor C1, SIN3B and SIN3A.
