= Additional sex combs like 2, transcriptional regulator =

Protein found in humans

ASXL2

Identifiers
- Aliases: ASXL2, ASXH2, additional sex combs like 2, transcriptional regulator, SHAPNS, ASXL transcriptional regulator 2
- External IDs: OMIM: 612991; MGI: 1922552; GeneCards: ASXL2

Gene location (Human)
Chr.	Chromosome 2 (human)
Band	2p23.3	Start	25,733,753 bp
Band	2p23.3	End	25,878,487 bp

Gene location (Mouse)
Chr.	Chromosome 12 (mouse)
Band	12|12 A1.1	Start	3,426,857 bp
Band	12|12 A1.1	End	3,506,852 bp
RNA expression pattern
Bgee	Human / Mouse (ortholog); Top expressed in: caput epididymis; corpus epididymis; tail of epididymis; mucosa of paranasal sinus; trabecular bone; skin of thigh; lower lobe of lung; bronchial epithelial cell; Skeletal muscle tissue of biceps brachii; superficial temporal artery / Top expressed in: lumbar spinal ganglion; genital tubercle; epithelium of small intestine; interventricular septum; spermatocyte; parotid gland; cumulus cell; tail of embryo; lumbar subsegment of spinal cord; Paneth cell; More reference expression data
BioGPS	n/a
Gene ontology
Molecular function	DNA binding; peroxisome proliferator activated receptor binding; metal ion binding; chromatin binding
Cellular component	nucleus; nucleoplasm; PR-DUB complex
Biological process	positive regulation of fat cell differentiation; regulation of transcription, DNA-templated; transcription, DNA-templated; positive regulation of transcription by RNA polymerase II; positive regulation of peroxisome proliferator activated receptor signaling pathway; protein deubiquitination; animal organ morphogenesis
Sources:Amigo / QuickGO
Orthologs
Databases	NCBI: entry; OMA: entry
Species	Human	Mouse
Entrez	55252	75302
Ensembl	ENSG00000143970	ENSMUSG00000037486
UniProt	Q76L83	Q8BZ32
RefSeq (mRNA)	NM_018263; NM_001369346; NM_001369347	NM_001270988; NM_172421
RefSeq (protein)	NP_060733; NP_001356275; NP_001356276	NP_001257917; NP_766009
Location (UCSC)	Chr 2: 25.73 – 25.88 Mb	Chr 12: 3.43 – 3.51 Mb
PubMed search
- Wikidata
View/Edit Human	View/Edit Mouse

Additional sex combs like 2, transcriptional regulator is a protein that in humans is encoded by the ASXL2 gene.

== Function ==
This gene encodes a member of a family of epigenetic regulators that bind various histone-modifying enzymes and are involved in the assembly of transcription factors at specific genomic loci. Naturally occurring mutations in this gene are associated with cancer in several tissue types (breast, bladder, pancreas, ovary, prostate, and blood). This gene plays an important role in neurodevelopment, cardiac function, adipogenesis, and osteoclastogenesis.

== See also ==
- Polycomb-group proteins
- ASXL1
- ASXL3
