= PPM1G =

Protein-coding gene in the species Homo sapiens

Identifiers
- Aliases: PPM1G, PP2CG, PP2CGAMMA, PPP2CG, protein phosphatase, Mg2+/Mn2+ dependent 1G
- External IDs: OMIM: 605119; MGI: 106065; GeneCards: PPM1G
Enzyme activity
EC #	BRENDA	ExPASy	KEGG	MetaCyc
3.1.3.16	↗	↗	↗	↗

Gene location (Human)
Chr.	Chromosome 2 (human)
Band	2p23.3	Start	27,381,195 bp
Band	2p23.3	End	27,409,591 bp

Gene location (Mouse)
Chr.	Chromosome 5 (mouse)
Band	5 B1|5 17.27 cM	Start	31,360,008 bp
Band	5 B1|5 17.27 cM	End	31,378,031 bp
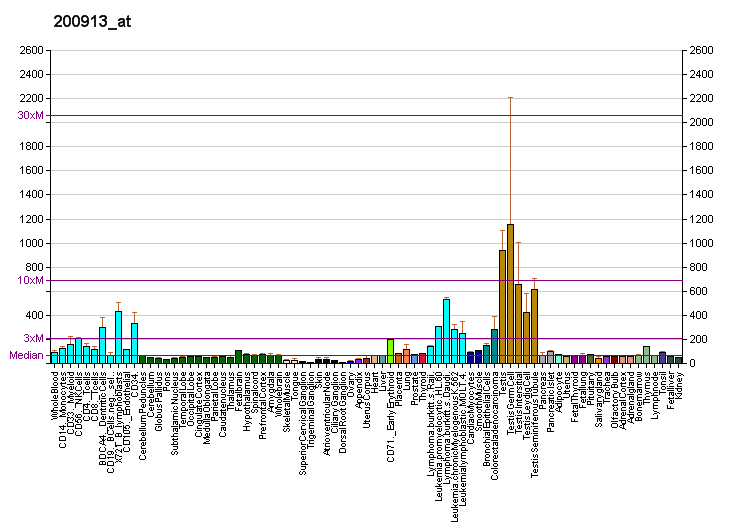
RNA expression pattern
Bgee	Human / Mouse (ortholog); Top expressed in: left testis; right testis; ganglionic eminence; sperm; ventricular zone; islet of Langerhans; mucosa of transverse colon; gastrocnemius muscle; granulocyte; stromal cell of endometrium / Top expressed in: fetal liver hematopoietic progenitor cell; spermatid; ectoderm; otic vesicle; otic placode; epiblast; seminiferous tubule; spermatocyte; tibiofemoral joint; primitive streak; More reference expression data
BioGPS	More reference expression data
Gene ontology
Molecular function	protein serine/threonine phosphatase activity; protein binding; catalytic activity; phosphoprotein phosphatase activity; hydrolase activity; metal ion binding; cation binding
Cellular component	cytoplasm; membrane; nucleus; nucleoplasm
Biological process	protein dephosphorylation; peptidyl-threonine dephosphorylation
Sources:Amigo / QuickGO
Orthologs
Databases	NCBI: entry; OMA: entry
Species	Human	Mouse
Entrez	5496	14208
Ensembl	ENSG00000115241	ENSMUSG00000029147
UniProt	O15355; Q6IAU5	Q61074
RefSeq (mRNA)	NM_177983	NM_008014
RefSeq (protein)	NP_817092; NP_817092.1	NP_032040
Location (UCSC)	Chr 2: 27.38 – 27.41 Mb	Chr 5: 31.36 – 31.38 Mb
PubMed search
- Wikidata
View/Edit Human	View/Edit Mouse

Protein phosphatase 1G is an enzyme that in humans is encoded by the PPM1G gene.

The protein encoded by this gene is a member of the PP2C family of Ser/Thr protein phosphatases. PP2C family members are known to be negative regulators of cell stress response pathways. This phosphatase is found to be responsible for the dephosphorylation of Pre-mRNA splicing factors, which is important for the formation of functional spliceosome. Studies of a similar gene in mice suggested a role of this phosphatase in regulating cell cycle progression. Alternatively spliced transcript variants encoding the same protein have been described.
