= UBE2O =

Protein-coding gene in the species Homo sapiens

Identifiers
- Aliases: UBE2O, E2-230K, ubiquitin conjugating enzyme E2 O
- External IDs: OMIM: 617649; MGI: 2444266; GeneCards: UBE2O
Enzyme activity
EC #	BRENDA	ExPASy	KEGG	MetaCyc
2.3.2.24	↗	↗	↗	↗

Gene location (Human)
Chr.	Chromosome 17 (human)
Band	17q25.1	Start	76,389,456 bp
Band	17q25.1	End	76,453,152 bp

Gene location (Mouse)
Chr.	Chromosome 11 (mouse)
Band	11|11 E2	Start	116,428,566 bp
Band	11|11 E2	End	116,472,273 bp
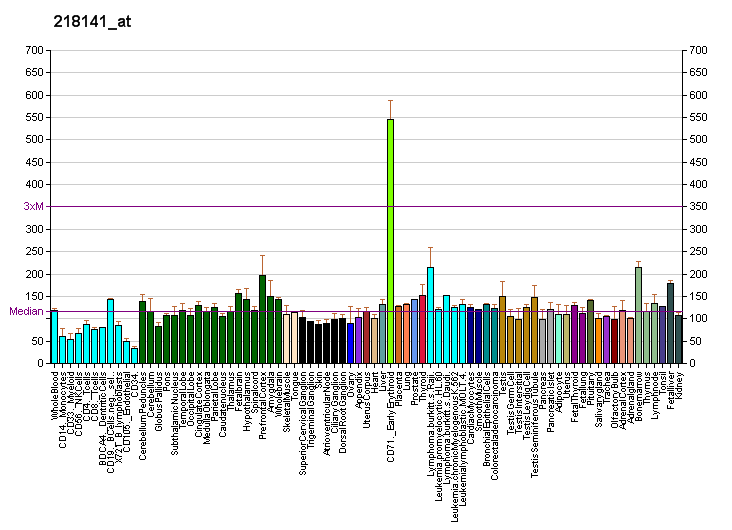
RNA expression pattern
Bgee	Human / Mouse (ortholog); Top expressed in: right hemisphere of cerebellum; right frontal lobe; apex of heart; prefrontal cortex; gastrocnemius muscle; Brodmann area 9; ganglionic eminence; stromal cell of endometrium; islet of Langerhans; right lobe of thyroid gland / Top expressed in: blood; tibiofemoral joint; primary visual cortex; superior frontal gyrus; dentate gyrus of hippocampal formation granule cell; perirhinal cortex; entorhinal cortex; fetal liver hematopoietic progenitor cell; CA3 field; central gray substance of midbrain; More reference expression data
BioGPS	More reference expression data
Gene ontology
Molecular function	transferase activity; nucleotide binding; protein binding; ATP binding; ubiquitin conjugating enzyme activity; ubiquitin protein ligase binding; ubiquitin protein ligase activity; ubiquitin-protein transferase activity; RNA binding
Cellular component	cytoplasm; nucleus; cytosol; nuclear body
Biological process	positive regulation of BMP signaling pathway; protein K63-linked ubiquitination; retrograde transport, endosome to Golgi; protein monoubiquitination; protein ubiquitination; transport
Sources:Amigo / QuickGO
Orthologs
Databases	NCBI: entry; OMA: entry
Species	Human	Mouse
Entrez	63893	217342
Ensembl	ENSG00000175931	ENSMUSG00000020802
UniProt	Q9C0C9	Q6ZPJ3
RefSeq (mRNA)	NM_022066	NM_173755
RefSeq (protein)	NP_071349	NP_776116
Location (UCSC)	Chr 17: 76.39 – 76.45 Mb	Chr 11: 116.43 – 116.47 Mb
PubMed search
- Wikidata
View/Edit Human	View/Edit Mouse

Ubiquitin-conjugating enzyme E2 O is a protein that in humans is encoded by the UBE2O gene.

UBE2O functions during terminal erythroid differentiation to eliminate generic cellular components in parallel with abundant synthesis of hemoglobin.
