= HIST2H2AC =

Protein-coding gene in humans

H2AC20

Identifiers
- Aliases: H2AC20, H2A, H2A-GL101, H2A/q, H2AFQ, histone cluster 2, H2ac, histone cluster 2 H2A family member c, H2A clustered histone 20, HIST2H2AC
- External IDs: OMIM: 602797; MGI: 2448316; GeneCards: H2AC20

Gene location (Human)
Chr.	Chromosome 1 (human)
Band	1q21.2	Start	149,886,918 bp
Band	1q21.2	End	149,887,411 bp

Gene location (Mouse)
Chr.	Chromosome 3 (mouse)
Band	3|3 F2.1	Start	96,127,677 bp
Band	3|3 F2.1	End	96,128,196 bp
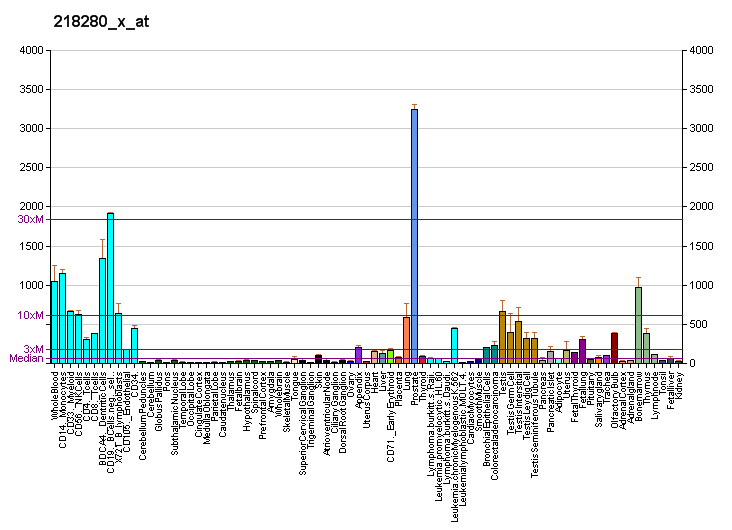
RNA expression pattern
Bgee	Human / Mouse (ortholog); Top expressed in: Achilles tendon; bone marrow cell; epithelium of colon; corpus callosum; sural nerve; testicle; gonad; blood; tonsil; cervix / Top expressed in: uterus; genital tubercle; spermatocyte; embryo; embryo; tail of embryo; mesencephalon; yolk sac; bone marrow; muscle of thigh; More reference expression data
BioGPS	More reference expression data
Gene ontology
Molecular function	protein heterodimerization activity; DNA binding; molecular function
Cellular component	nucleosome; nucleus; chromosome; extracellular exosome
Biological process	chromatin organization; biological process
Sources:Amigo / QuickGO
Orthologs
Databases	NCBI: entry; OMA: entry
Species	Human	Mouse
Entrez	8338	319176
Ensembl	ENSG00000184260	ENSMUSG00000068855
UniProt	Q16777	Q64523
RefSeq (mRNA)	NM_003517	NM_175662
RefSeq (protein)	NP_003508	NP_783593
Location (UCSC)	Chr 1: 149.89 – 149.89 Mb	Chr 3: 96.13 – 96.13 Mb
PubMed search
- Wikidata
View/Edit Human	View/Edit Mouse

Histone H2A type 2-C is a protein that in humans is encoded by the HIST2H2AC gene.

Histones are basic nuclear proteins that are responsible for the nucleosome structure of the chromosomal fiber in eukaryotes. Two molecules of each of the four core histones (H2A, H2B, H3, and H4) form an octamer, around which approximately 146 bp of DNA is wrapped in repeating units, called nucleosomes. The linker histone, H1, interacts with linker DNA between nucleosomes and functions in the compaction of chromatin into higher order structures. This gene is intronless and encodes a member of the histone H2A family.
