= Kelch-like protein 7 =

Protein-coding gene in the species Homo sapiens

KLHL7
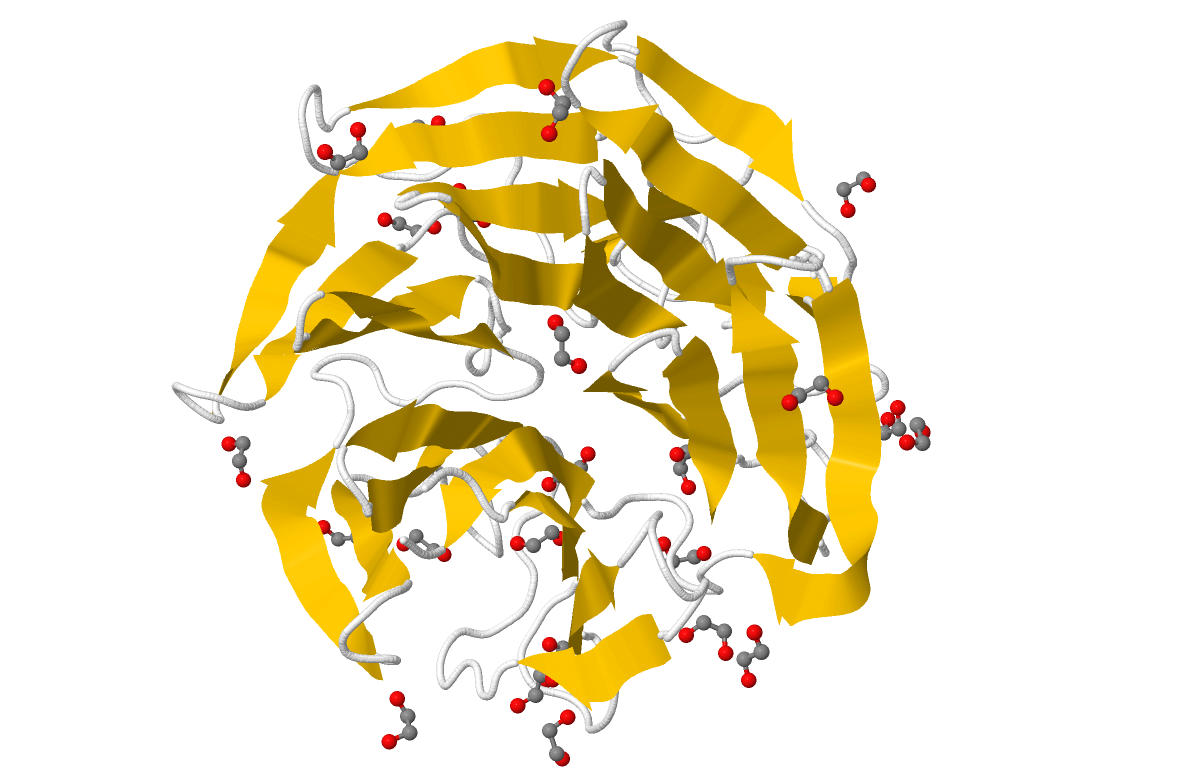

Identifiers
- Aliases: KLHL7, KLHL6, SBBI26, kelch like family member 7, CISS3, PERCHING
- External IDs: OMIM: 611119; MGI: 1196453; GeneCards: KLHL7
Available structures
PDB	Ortholog search: PDBe RCSB
PDB	List of PDB id codes 3II7

Gene location (Human)
Chr.	Chromosome 7 (human)
Band	7p15.3	Start	23,105,758 bp
Band	7p15.3	End	23,177,914 bp

Gene location (Mouse)
Chr.	Chromosome 5 (mouse)
Band	5 A3|5 10.67 cM	Start	24,305,603 bp
Band	5 A3|5 10.67 cM	End	24,365,790 bp
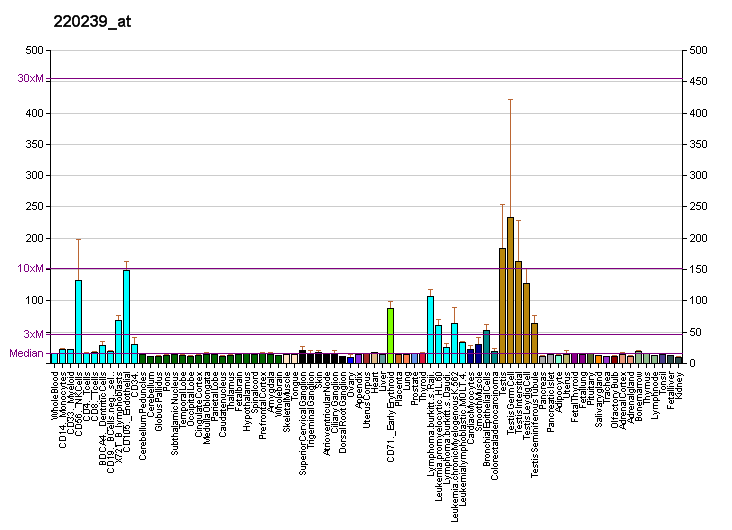

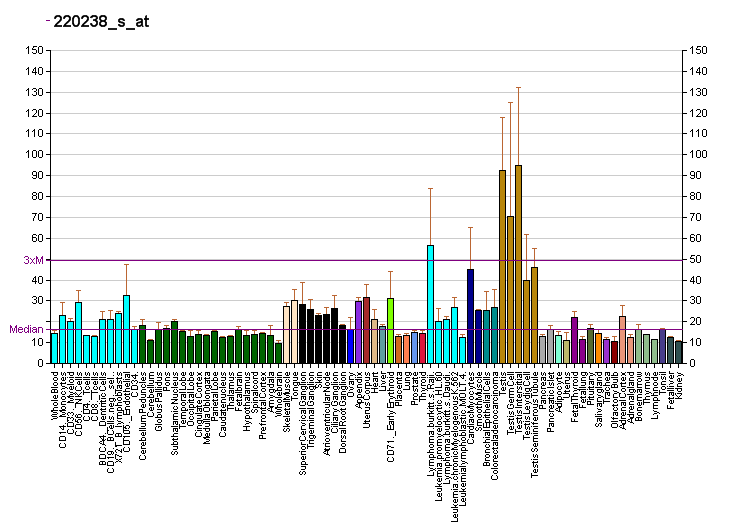
RNA expression pattern
Bgee	Human / Mouse (ortholog); Top expressed in: oocyte; secondary oocyte; right ventricle; sperm; ganglionic eminence; left testis; right testis; lateral nuclear group of thalamus; ventricular zone; myocardium of left ventricle / Top expressed in: ganglionic eminence; medial ganglionic eminence; ventricular zone; superior cervical ganglion; islet of Langerhans; ventromedial nucleus; Epithelium of choroid plexus; sternocleidomastoid muscle; nucleus accumbens; myocardium of ventricle; More reference expression data
BioGPS	More reference expression data
Gene ontology
Molecular function	protein binding; protein homodimerization activity; identical protein binding; ubiquitin-protein transferase activity
Cellular component	plasma membrane; nucleolus; nucleoplasm; nucleus; Cul3-RING ubiquitin ligase complex; cytoplasm; cytosol; perinuclear region of cytoplasm
Biological process	protein ubiquitination
Sources:Amigo / QuickGO
Orthologs
Databases	NCBI: entry; OMA: entry
Species	Human	Mouse
Entrez	55975	52323
Ensembl	ENSG00000122550	ENSMUSG00000028986
UniProt	Q8IXQ5	Q8BUL5
RefSeq (mRNA)	NM_001031710; NM_001172428; NM_018846	NM_001161800; NM_026448
RefSeq (protein)	NP_001026880; NP_001165899; NP_061334	NP_001155272; NP_080724
Location (UCSC)	Chr 7: 23.11 – 23.18 Mb	Chr 5: 24.31 – 24.37 Mb
PubMed search
- Wikidata
View/Edit Human	View/Edit Mouse

Kelch-like protein 7 is a protein that in humans is encoded by the KLHL7 gene.
