= Ubiquitin carboxyl-terminal hydrolase L5 =

Protein found in humans

UCHL5
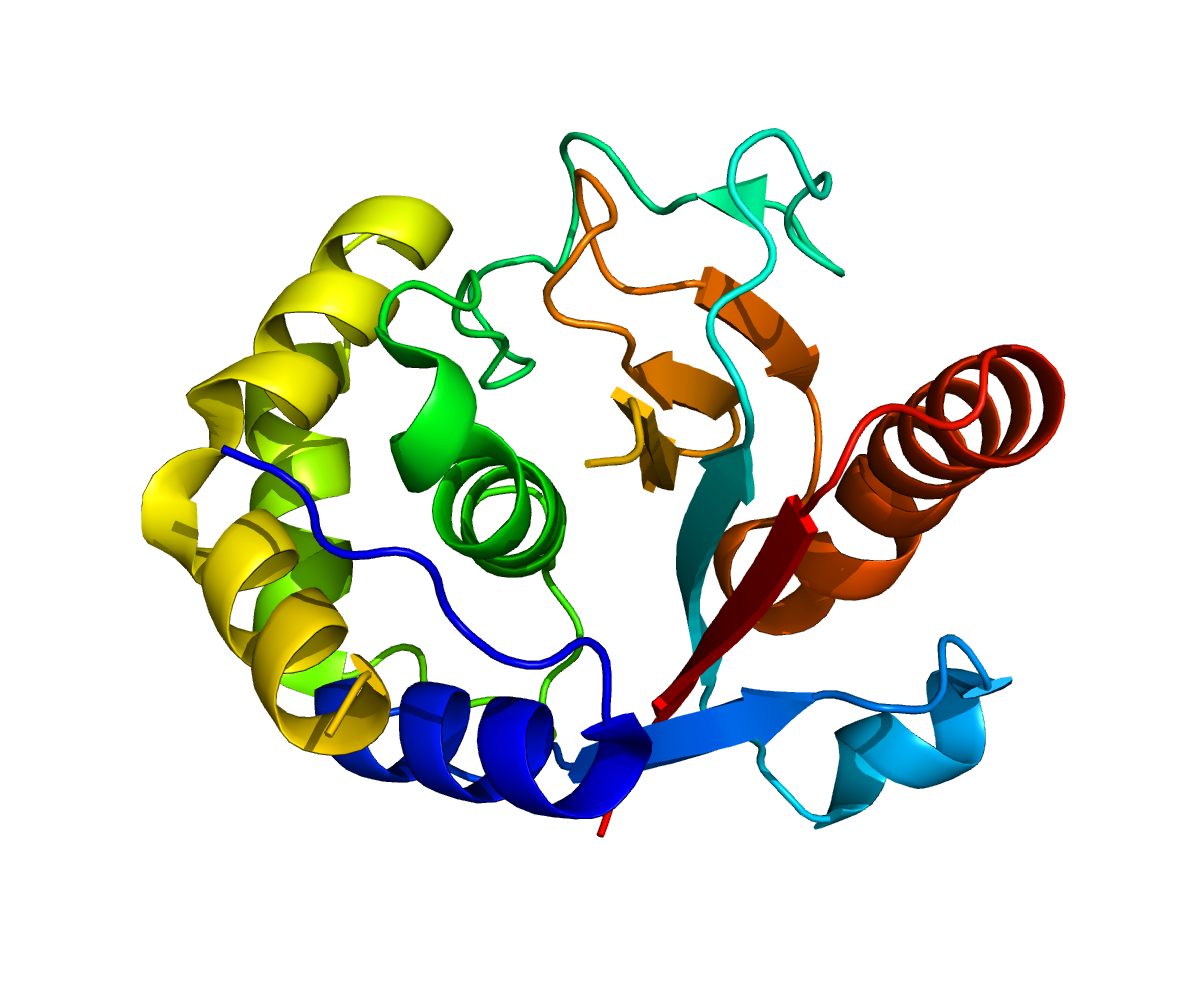

Identifiers
- Aliases: UCHL5, CGI-70, INO80R, UCH-L5, UCH37, Ubiquitin carboxyl-terminal hydrolase L5, ubiquitin C-terminal hydrolase L5
- External IDs: OMIM: 610667; MGI: 1914848; GeneCards: UCHL5
Available structures
PDB	Ortholog search: PDBe RCSB
PDB	List of PDB id codes 3A7S, 3IHR, 3RII, 3RIS, 3TB3, 4UEL, 4UEM, 4UF5, 4UF6, 4WLP
Enzyme activity
EC #	BRENDA	ExPASy	KEGG	MetaCyc
3.4.19.12	↗	↗	↗	↗

Gene location (Human)
Chr.	Chromosome 1 (human)
Band	1q31.2	Start	193,012,250 bp
Band	1q31.2	End	193,060,080 bp

Gene location (Mouse)
Chr.	Chromosome 1 (mouse)
Band	1 F|1 62.54 cM	Start	143,653,010 bp
Band	1 F|1 62.54 cM	End	143,683,204 bp
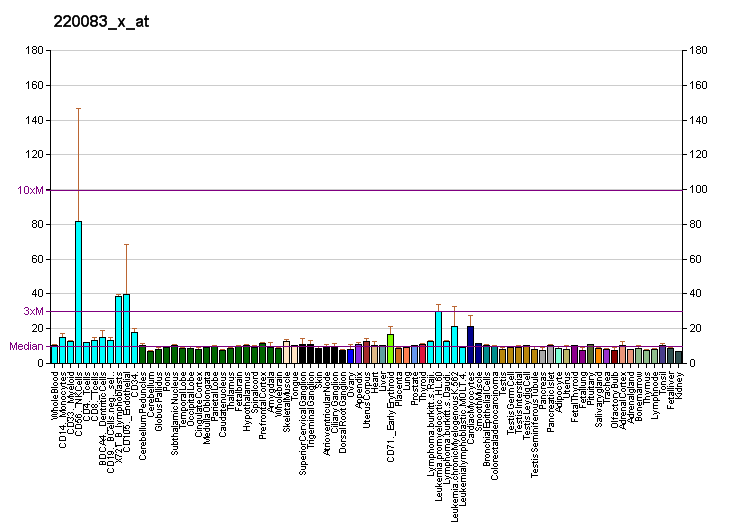

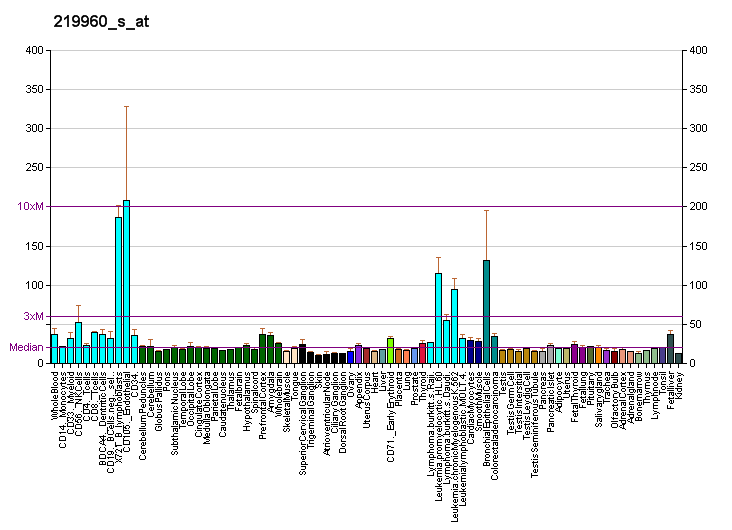
RNA expression pattern
Bgee	Human / Mouse (ortholog); Top expressed in: Achilles tendon; islet of Langerhans; body of pancreas; prefrontal cortex; muscle of thigh; rectum; monocyte; gonad; gastrocnemius muscle; epithelium of colon / Top expressed in: morula; embryo; blastocyst; yolk sac; parotid gland; otic placode; tail of embryo; medial vestibular nucleus; deep cerebellar nuclei; epiblast; More reference expression data
BioGPS	More reference expression data
Gene ontology
Molecular function	cysteine-type peptidase activity; thiol-dependent deubiquitinase; peptidase activity; protein binding; endopeptidase inhibitor activity; hydrolase activity; RNA binding; proteasome binding
Cellular component	cytoplasm; intracellular anatomical structure; proteasome complex; nucleus; cytosolic proteasome complex; nucleoplasm; mitochondrion; cytosol; Ino80 complex
Biological process	regulation of proteasomal protein catabolic process; DNA recombination; regulation of transcription, DNA-templated; lateral ventricle development; ubiquitin-dependent protein catabolic process; transcription, DNA-templated; proteolysis; cellular response to DNA damage stimulus; forebrain morphogenesis; DNA repair; midbrain development; negative regulation of endopeptidase activity; protein deubiquitination; negative regulation of proteasomal ubiquitin-dependent protein catabolic process
Sources:Amigo / QuickGO
Orthologs
Databases	NCBI: entry; OMA: entry
Species	Human	Mouse
Entrez	51377	56207
Ensembl	ENSG00000116750	ENSMUSG00000018189
UniProt	Q9Y5K5; Q5LJB0	Q9WUP7
RefSeq (mRNA)	NM_001199261; NM_001199262; NM_001199263; NM_015984; NM_001350840 NM_001350841; NM_001350842; NM_001350843; NM_001350844; NM_001350845; NM_001350846; NM_001350847; NM_001350848; NM_001350849; NM_001350850; NM_001350851; NM_001350852	NM_001159866; NM_019562
RefSeq (protein)	NP_001186190; NP_001186191; NP_001186192; NP_057068; NP_001337769 NP_001337770; NP_001337771; NP_001337772; NP_001337773; NP_001337774; NP_001337775; NP_001337776; NP_001337777; NP_001337778; NP_001337779; NP_001337780; NP_001337781	NP_001153338; NP_062508
Location (UCSC)	Chr 1: 193.01 – 193.06 Mb	Chr 1: 143.65 – 143.68 Mb
PubMed search
- Wikidata
View/Edit Human	View/Edit Mouse

Ubiquitin carboxyl-terminal hydrolase isozyme L5 is an enzyme that in humans is encoded by the UCHL5 gene.
