= ANKRD17 =

Protein-coding gene in the species Homo sapiens

Identifiers
- Aliases: ANKRD17, GTAR, NY-BR-16, MASK2, ankyrin repeat domain 17, CAGS
- External IDs: OMIM: 615929; MGI: 1932101; GeneCards: ANKRD17

Gene location (Human)
Chr.	Chromosome 4 (human)
Band	4q13.3	Start	73,073,376 bp
Band	4q13.3	End	73,258,798 bp

Gene location (Mouse)
Chr.	Chromosome 5 (mouse)
Band	5|5 E1	Start	90,375,025 bp
Band	5|5 E1	End	90,514,436 bp
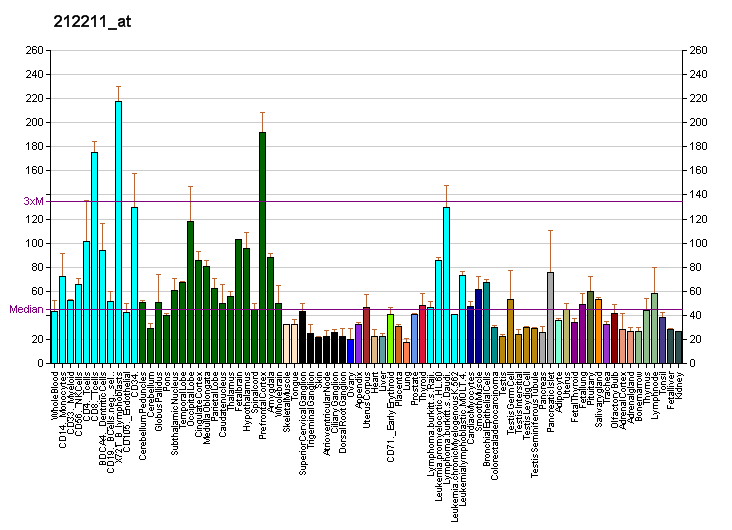
RNA expression pattern
Bgee	Human / Mouse (ortholog); Top expressed in: secondary oocyte; sural nerve; visceral pleura; parietal pleura; middle temporal gyrus; lateral nuclear group of thalamus; Brodmann area 23; internal globus pallidus; cardia; pylorus / Top expressed in: zygote; secondary oocyte; primary oocyte; Rostral migratory stream; saccule; Gonadal ridge; lacrimal gland; human fetus; dorsomedial hypothalamic nucleus; efferent ductule; More reference expression data
BioGPS	More reference expression data
Gene ontology
Molecular function	nucleic acid binding; chromatin binding; protein binding; RNA binding
Cellular component	cytoplasm; chromatin; membrane; nucleus; nuclear membrane
Biological process	positive regulation of I-kappaB kinase/NF-kappaB signaling; positive regulation of G1/S transition of mitotic cell cycle; innate immune response; viral process; positive regulation of cell cycle; positive regulation of RIG-I signaling pathway; defense response to bacterium; positive regulation of MDA-5 signaling pathway; negative regulation of smooth muscle cell differentiation; regulation of DNA replication; immune system process; blood vessel maturation
Sources:Amigo / QuickGO
Orthologs
Databases	NCBI: entry; OMA: entry
Species	Human	Mouse
Entrez	26057	81702
Ensembl	ENSG00000132466	ENSMUSG00000055204
UniProt	O75179	Q99NH0
RefSeq (mRNA)	NM_001286771; NM_032217; NM_198889; NM_015574	NM_030886; NM_198010; NM_001401341
RefSeq (protein)	NP_001273700; NP_056389; NP_115593; NP_942592	NP_112148; NP_932127; NP_001388270
Location (UCSC)	Chr 4: 73.07 – 73.26 Mb	Chr 5: 90.38 – 90.51 Mb
PubMed search
- Wikidata
View/Edit Human	View/Edit Mouse

Ankyrin repeat domain-containing protein 17 is a protein that in humans is encoded by the ANKRD17 gene.

This gene encodes a protein with ankyrin repeats, which are associated with protein-protein interactions. Studies in mice suggest that this protein is involved in liver development. Two transcript variants encoding different isoforms have been found for this gene.

De novo mutations to ANKRD17 are known to cause Chopra-Amiel-Gordon syndrome. Genetic analysis of individuals with CAGS suggests that the disorder follows the haploinsufficiency model of gene action.
