= HSPA2 =

Protein-coding gene in the species Homo sapiens

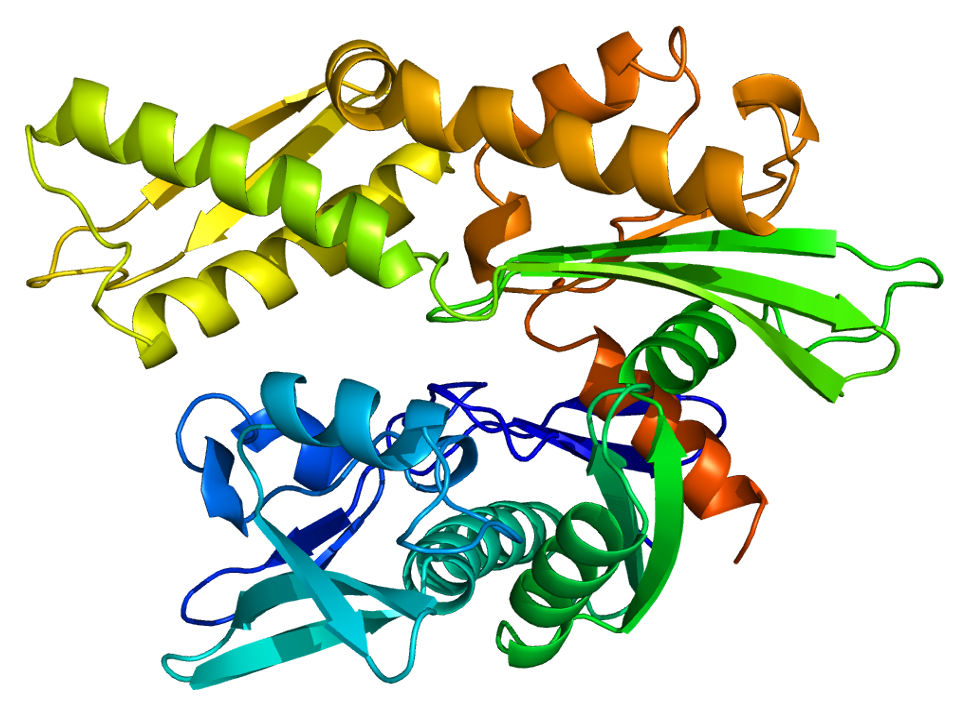

Identifiers
- Aliases: HSPA2, HSP70-2, HSP70-3, heat shock protein family A (Hsp70) member 2
- External IDs: OMIM: 140560; MGI: 96243; GeneCards: HSPA2
Available structures
PDB	Ortholog search: PDBe RCSB
PDB	List of PDB id codes 3I33, 4FSV, 5FPM, 5FPN, 5FPD, 5FPE

Gene location (Human)
Chr.	Chromosome 14 (human)
Band	14q23.3	Start	64,535,905 bp
Band	14q23.3	End	64,546,173 bp

Gene location (Mouse)
Chr.	Chromosome 12 (mouse)
Band	12 C3|12 33.73 cM	Start	76,450,950 bp
Band	12 C3|12 33.73 cM	End	76,453,712 bp
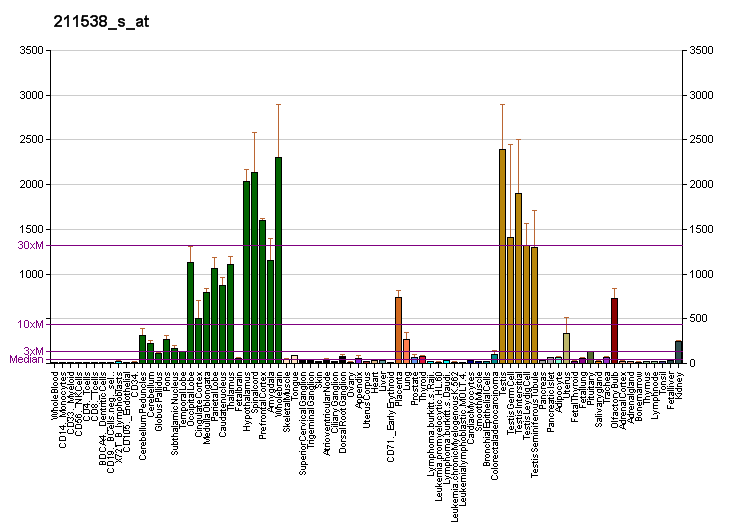
RNA expression pattern
Bgee	Human / Mouse (ortholog); Top expressed in: inferior ganglion of vagus nerve; middle frontal gyrus; subthalamic nucleus; external globus pallidus; medulla oblongata; pars reticulata; internal globus pallidus; superior vestibular nucleus; Skeletal muscle tissue of rectus abdominis; corpus callosum / Top expressed in: seminiferous tubule; spermatocyte; spermatid; ascending aorta; aortic valve; dentate gyrus of hippocampal formation granule cell; piriform cortex; hippocampus proper; supraoptic nucleus; olfactory epithelium; More reference expression data
BioGPS	More reference expression data
Gene ontology
Molecular function	nucleotide binding; unfolded protein binding; protein binding; enzyme binding; ATP binding; disordered domain specific binding; glycolipid binding; ATPase activity; heat shock protein binding; protein folding chaperone activity; tau protein binding; chaperone binding; misfolded protein binding
Cellular component	cytoplasm; cytosol; blood microparticle; membrane; spindle; extracellular exosome; cytoskeleton; nucleus; synaptonemal complex; male germ cell nucleus; mitochondrion; cell surface; CatSper complex; myelin sheath; meiotic spindle; plasma membrane
Biological process	cell differentiation; negative regulation of inclusion body assembly; response to heat; response to unfolded protein; protein refolding; spermatogenesis; response to cold; positive regulation of protein phosphorylation; male meiotic nuclear division; male meiosis I; spermatid development; positive regulation of ATP-dependent activity; synaptonemal complex disassembly; positive regulation of ATPase-coupled calcium transmembrane transporter activity; positive regulation of G2/M transition of mitotic cell cycle; vesicle-mediated transport; cellular response to heat; Unfolded Protein Response; chaperone cofactor-dependent protein refolding
Sources:Amigo / QuickGO
Orthologs
Databases	NCBI: entry; OMA: entry
Species	Human	Mouse
Entrez	3306	15512
Ensembl	ENSG00000126803	ENSMUSG00000059970
UniProt	P54652	P17156
RefSeq (mRNA)	NM_021979; NM_001387931	NM_001002012; NM_008301
RefSeq (protein)	NP_068814	NP_001002012; NP_032327
Location (UCSC)	Chr 14: 64.54 – 64.55 Mb	Chr 12: 76.45 – 76.45 Mb
PubMed search
- Wikidata
View/Edit Human	View/Edit Mouse

Heat shock-related 70 kDa protein 2 is a protein that in humans is encoded by the HSPA2 gene.
