= FOXK2 =

Protein-coding gene in the species Homo sapiens

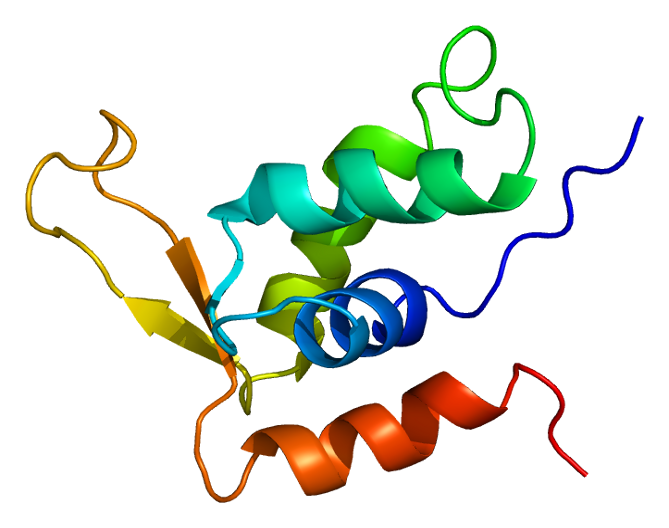

Identifiers
- Aliases: FOXK2, ILF, ILF-1, ILF1, forkhead box K2, nGTBP
- External IDs: OMIM: 147685; MGI: 1916087; GeneCards: FOXK2
Available structures
PDB	Ortholog search: PDBe RCSB
PDB	List of PDB id codes 1JXS, 2C6Y

Gene location (Human)
Chr.	Chromosome 17 (human)
Band	17q25.3	Start	82,519,713 bp
Band	17q25.3	End	82,644,662 bp

Gene location (Mouse)
Chr.	Chromosome 11 (mouse)
Band	11|11 E2	Start	121,259,990 bp
Band	11|11 E2	End	121,309,896 bp
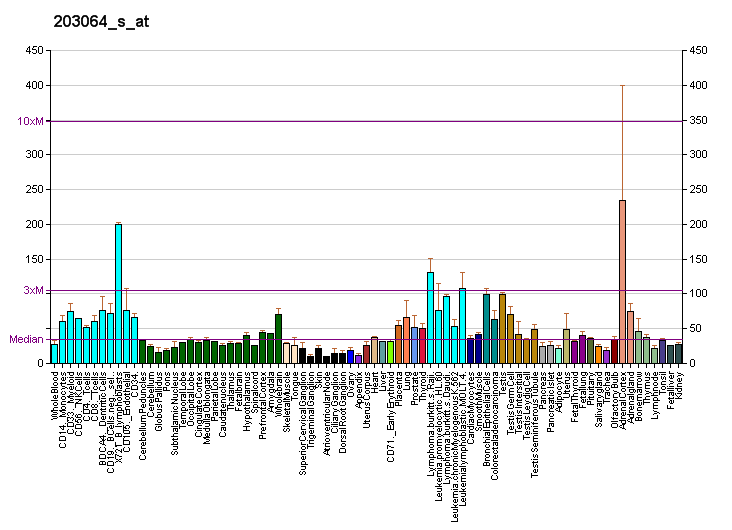
RNA expression pattern
Bgee	Human / Mouse (ortholog); Top expressed in: gastrocnemius muscle; sural nerve; ganglionic eminence; oocyte; muscle of thigh; ventricular zone; left testis; right testis; gingival epithelium; sperm / Top expressed in: zygote; secondary oocyte; cumulus cell; ventricular zone; ascending aorta; renal corpuscle; tail of embryo; otic vesicle; mandibular prominence; spermatocyte; More reference expression data
BioGPS	More reference expression data
Gene ontology
Molecular function	DNA-binding transcription factor activity; RNA polymerase II cis-regulatory region sequence-specific DNA binding; sequence-specific DNA binding; DNA binding; DNA-binding transcription activator activity, RNA polymerase II-specific; protein binding; magnesium ion binding; metal ion binding; DNA-binding transcription factor activity, RNA polymerase II-specific; transcription cis-regulatory region binding; DNA-binding transcription repressor activity, RNA polymerase II-specific
Cellular component	nucleus; nucleoplasm; cytoplasm
Biological process	regulation of transcription by RNA polymerase II; regulation of transcription, DNA-templated; positive regulation of transcription by RNA polymerase II; transcription, DNA-templated; transcription by RNA polymerase II; protein deubiquitination; anatomical structure morphogenesis; cell differentiation; negative regulation of transcription by RNA polymerase II; cellular glucose homeostasis; negative regulation of autophagy; regulation of glucose metabolic process; response to starvation; negative regulation of transcription, DNA-templated; positive regulation of transcription, DNA-templated; canonical glycolysis
Sources:Amigo / QuickGO
Orthologs
Databases	NCBI: entry; OMA: entry
Species	Human	Mouse
Entrez	3607	68837
Ensembl	ENSG00000141568	ENSMUSG00000039275
UniProt	Q01167	Q3UCQ1
RefSeq (mRNA)	NM_004514; NM_181430; NM_181431	NM_001080932; NM_001363033
RefSeq (protein)	NP_004505	NP_001074401; NP_001349962
Location (UCSC)	Chr 17: 82.52 – 82.64 Mb	Chr 11: 121.26 – 121.31 Mb
PubMed search
- Wikidata
View/Edit Human	View/Edit Mouse

Forkhead box protein K2 is a protein that in humans is encoded by the FOXK2 gene.

The protein encoded by this gene contains a fork head DNA binding domain. This protein can bind to the purine-rich motifs of the HIV long terminal repeat (LTR), and to the similar purine-rich motif in the interleukin 2 (IL2) promoter. It may be involved in the regulation of viral and cellular promoter elements.
