= ASXL1 =

Protein-coding gene in humans

Identifiers
- Aliases: ASXL1, BOPS, MDS, additional sex combs like 1, transcriptional regulator, ASXL transcriptional regulator 1
- External IDs: OMIM: 612990; MGI: 2684063; HomoloGene: 9098; GeneCards: ASXL1; OMA:ASXL1 - orthologs

Gene location (Human)
Chr.	Chromosome 20 (human)
Band	20q11.21	Start	32,358,330 bp
Band	20q11.21	End	32,439,319 bp

Gene location (Mouse)
Chr.	Chromosome 2 (mouse)
Band	2|2 H1	Start	153,187,749 bp
Band	2|2 H1	End	153,245,927 bp
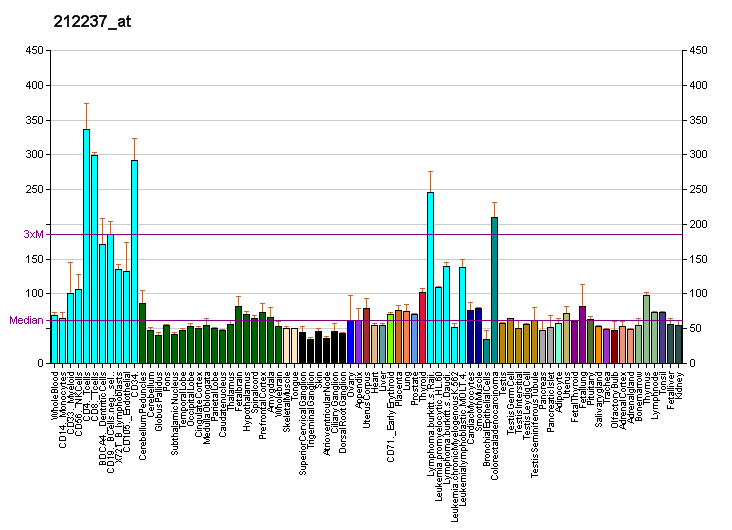

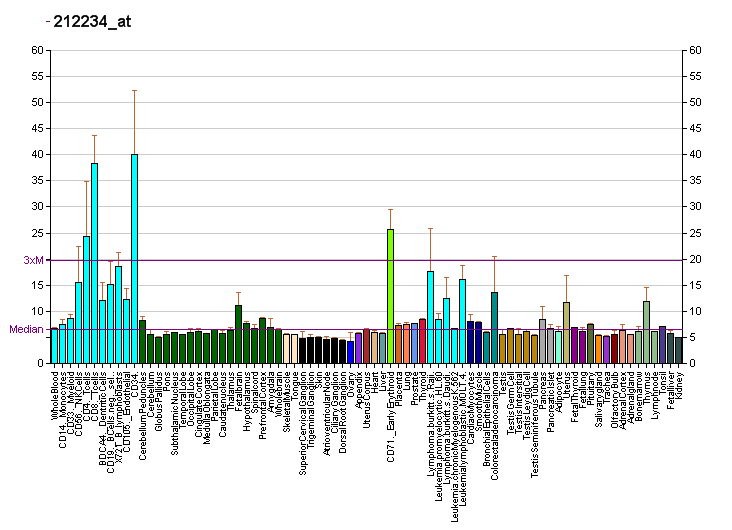

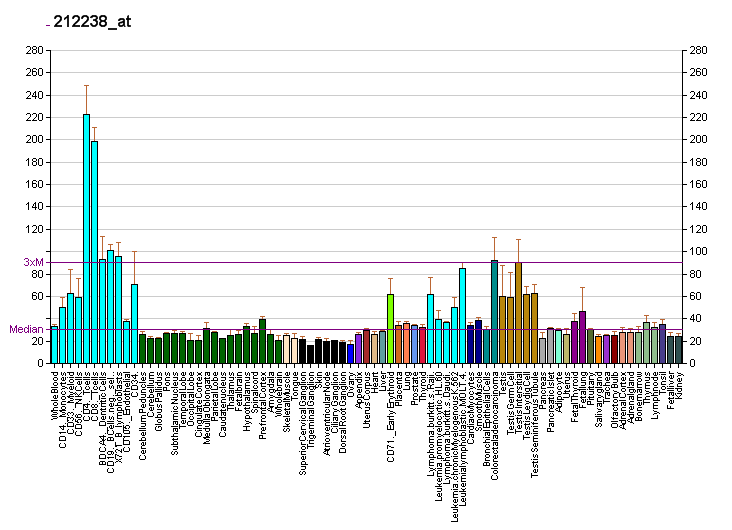
RNA expression pattern
Bgee	Human / Mouse (ortholog); Top expressed in: sural nerve; sperm; gastric mucosa; left testis; ventricular zone; body of pancreas; right testis; oocyte; epithelium of colon; left lobe of thyroid gland / Top expressed in: primitive streak; renal corpuscle; condyle; primary oocyte; medullary collecting duct; secondary oocyte; zygote; fossa; spermatid; Rostral migratory stream; More reference expression data
BioGPS	More reference expression data
Gene ontology
Molecular function	DNA binding; metal ion binding; protein binding; peroxisome proliferator activated receptor binding; transcription coactivator activity; retinoic acid receptor binding; chromatin binding
Cellular component	PR-DUB complex; nucleus; nucleoplasm
Biological process	regulation of transcription, DNA-templated; heart morphogenesis; monoubiquitinated histone H2A deubiquitination; transcription, DNA-templated; lung saccule development; bone development; negative regulation of fat cell differentiation; positive regulation of retinoic acid receptor signaling pathway; negative regulation of peroxisome proliferator activated receptor signaling pathway; positive regulation of transcription by RNA polymerase II; response to retinoic acid; cell morphogenesis; animal organ morphogenesis; protein deubiquitination; hematopoietic or lymphoid organ development; thymus development; bone marrow development; homeostasis of number of cells; chromatin organization; hemopoiesis
Sources:Amigo / QuickGO
Orthologs
Species	Human	Mouse
Entrez	171023	228790
Ensembl	ENSG00000171456	ENSMUSG00000042548
UniProt	Q8IXJ9	P59598
RefSeq (mRNA)	NM_001164603; NM_015338; NM_001363734	NM_001039939
RefSeq (protein)	NP_001158075; NP_056153; NP_001350663; NP_001158075.1	NP_001035028
Location (UCSC)	Chr 20: 32.36 – 32.44 Mb	Chr 2: 153.19 – 153.25 Mb
PubMed search
- Wikidata
View/Edit Human	View/Edit Mouse

Putative Polycomb group protein ASXL1 is a protein that in humans is encoded by the ASXL1 gene.

In Drosophila, the Additional sex combs (Asx) gene encodes a chromatin-binding protein required for normal determination of segment identity in the developing embryo. The protein is a member of the Polycomb group of proteins, which are necessary for the maintenance of stable repression of homeotic and other loci. The protein is thought to disrupt chromatin in localized areas, enhancing transcription of certain genes while repressing the transcription of other genes. The protein encoded by this gene functions as a ligand-dependent co-activator for retinoic acid receptor in cooperation with nuclear receptor coactivator 1. Mutations in this gene are associated with myelodysplastic syndromes and chronic myelomonocytic leukemia. Alternative splicing results in multiple transcript variants.

== See also ==
- ASXL2
- ASXL3
