= HHV infected cell polypeptide 0 =

Protein

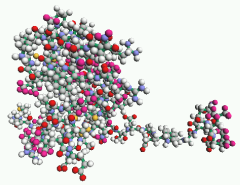
Structure of the ring-finger domain of ICP0

Human herpes virus (HHV) infected cell polypeptide 0 (ICP0) is a protein, encoded by the DNA of herpes viruses. It is produced by herpes viruses during the earliest stage of infection, when the virus has recently entered the host cell; this stage is known as the immediate-early or α ("alpha") phase of viral gene expression. During these early stages of infection, ICP0 protein is synthesized and transported to the nucleus of the infected host cell. Here, ICP0 promotes transcription from viral genes, disrupts structures in the nucleus known as nuclear dots or promyelocytic leukemia (PML) nuclear bodies, and alters the expression of host and viral genes in combination with a neuron specific protein. At later stages of cellular infection, ICP0 relocates to the cell cytoplasm to be incorporated into new virion particles.

== History and background ==
ICP0 was identified as an immediate-early polypeptide product of herpes simplex virus-1 (HSV-1) infection in 1976. The gene, in HSV-1, from which ICP0 is produced is known as HSV-1 α0 ("alpha zero"), Immediate Early (IE) gene 1, or simply as the HSV-1 ICP0 gene. The HSV-1 ICP0 gene was characterized and sequenced in 1986. This sequence predicted a 775 amino acid sequence with a molecular weight of 78.5 KDa. At the time of gene isolation, ICP0 was known as IE110 as gel electrophoresis experiments performed prior to obtaining the gene sequence indicated the ICP0 protein weighed 110 kDa. Post-translational modifications, such as phosphorylation or sumoylation, were presumed to account for the actual protein size appearing 30 kDa larger than that of the predicted amino acid sequence.

== Functions ==
=== Dismantle microtubule networks ===
ICP0 co-localizes with α-tubulin, and dismantles host cell microtubule networks once it translocates to the cytoplasm.

=== Transcription ===
In HSV-1 infected cells, ICP0 activates the transcription of many viral and cellular genes. It acts synergistically with HSV-1 immediate early (IE) protein, ICP4, and is essential for the reactivation of latent herpes virus and viral replication.

=== Degradation of antiviral pathways ===
ICP0 is responsible for overcoming a variety of cellular antiviral responses. After translocating to the nucleus early in infection, ICP0 promotes the degradation of many cellular antiviral genes, including those for nuclear body-associated proteins promyelocytic leukemia protein (PML) and Sp100, causing disruption of PML nuclear bodies and reduced cellular antiviral capacity. ICP0 also inhibits the activity of IFN regulatory factors (IRF3) and IRF7, which are key transcription factors that induce production of antiviral cytokines called interferons. Barriers to viral replication induced by interferons can also be overcome by the action of ICP0. This function of ICP0 also prevents the production of RNase L, an enzyme that degrades single-stranded viral and cellular RNAs and induces host cell apoptosis in virus infected cells.

=== Interaction with host cell SUMO-1 protein and disruption PML nuclear bodies ===
Small ubiquitin-related modifier 1 (SUMO-1) is a protein produced by human cells that is involved in the modification of many proteins, including human PML protein. HSV-1 ICP0 and several of its homologs in other herpes viruses bind to SUMO-1 in a manner similar to endogenous proteins, causing depletion of SUMO-1, and disruption of nuclear bodies.

=== Interaction with neuron-differentiating protein NRSF and protein cofactor coREST ===
ICP0 interacts with a human protein, known as neuronal restrictive silencer factor (NRSF) or RE1-silencing transcription factor (REST), that regulates differences in gene expression between cells of neuronal or non-neuronal origin. NRSF is found in non-neuronal cells but not in fully differentiated neurons. This interaction is attributed to the partial similarity of ICP0 to the human protein CoREST, also called REST corepressor 1 (RCOR1), which combines with NRSF to repress expression of neuronal genes in non-neuronal cells.

Although the full NRSF protein is not typically found in neurons, truncated forms of NRSF are produced that selectively control the expression of certain neurotransmitter channels in specialized neurons. Combination of ICP0 with these NRSF-like neuronal factors may silence herpes genes in neurons, blocking the production of other immediate-early genes such as ICP4 and reducing production of ICP22. The repressed production of immediate-early HSV genes may contribute to the establishment of latency during infection with herpes viruses.

CoREST and NRSF combine with another cellular protein, histone deacetylase-1 (HDAC1) to form a HDAC/CoREST/NRSF complex. This complex silences production of the HSV-1 protein ICP4 by interfering with chromatin remodeling of the viral DNA that is necessary to allow viral gene transcription; it deacetylates histones associated with viral DNA in viral chromatin. Furthermore, an NRSF-binding region is located between the viral genes expressing proteins ICP4 and ICP22. ICP0 interacts with coREST, dissociating HDAC1 from CoREST/NRSF in the HDAC/CoREST/NRSF complex and preventing the silencing of the HSV genome in non-neuronal cells.

== Suppression of ICP0 activity ==
=== Interaction with latency-associated RNA transcript (LAT) ===
During latent infection a viral RNA transcript inhibits expression of the herpes virus ICP0 gene via an antisense RNA mechanism. The RNA transcript is produced by the virus and accumulates in host cells during latent infection; it is known as latency associated transcript (LAT). A chromatin insulator region between promoters of the LAT and ICP0 genes of the HSV-1 genome may allow for the independent regulation of their expression.

=== Silencing of ICP0 gene activity by ICP4 ===
Although it is tempting to hypothesize that LAT is the repressor of the ICP0 gene, evidence supporting this hypothesis is lacking. Recent data suggest that ICP4 strongly suppresses the ICP0 gene, and ICP0 antagonizes ICP4. The balance between ICP0 and ICP4 dictates whether the ICP0 gene can be efficiently transcribed.

== Homologs across herpes virus species ==
The ICP0 gene and protein from HSV-1 have orthologs in related viruses from the herpes virus family. HSV-2 ICP0 is predicted to produce a polypeptide of 825 amino acids with a predicted molecular weight of 81986 Da, and 61.5% amino acid sequence similarity to HSV-1 ICP0. Simian varicella virus (SVV) is a varicellovirus that, like HSV-1 and HSV-2, belongs to the alphaherpesvirinae subfamily of herpes viruses. SVV expresses an HSV-1 LAT ortholog known as SVV LAT, and an HSV-1 ICP0 ortholog known as SVV ORF-61 (Open Reading Frame 61). Varicella zoster virus (VZV) is another varicellovirus in which a homolog of HSV-1 ICP0 gene has been identified; VSV ORF-61 is a partial homolog and a functional replacement for HSV-1 ICP0 gene.

Herpes virus ICP-0 homologs and nomenclature
| Herpes virus | | ICP0 Synonyms | Structural homology and functional similarity |
| HHV-1 | Herpes simplex virus-1 (HSV-1) | ICP0, IE110 | (n/a) |
| HHV-2 | Herpes simplex virus-2 (HSV-2) | ICP0, IE110 | has 61.5% amino acid sequence homology to HSV-1 ICP0. |
| HHV-3 | Varicella zoster virus (VZV) | ORF-61 | Shows homology to HSV-1 in the cysteine rich RING finger domain found at the N-terminal end of ORF-61. Two cell lines expressing VZV ORF-61 are specifically able to support infection by synthetic HSV with ICP0-deletion. |
| SVV | Simian varicella virus | ORF-61 | The mRNA for ORF-61 contains sequence that is antisense to SVV LAT, allowing for gene silencing of ORF-61 by SVV LAT in an analogous mechanism to ICP0 silencing by LAT in HSV-1. |
| PRV | Pseudorabies virus | EP0 | Both HSV-1 ICP0 and VZV ORF-61 support growth and infectability of PRV that is deficient in its ICP0 ortholog, EP0. |
| HHV-4 | Epstein-Barr virus (EBV), lymphocryptovirus | BZLF1 | Analogous to ICP0 and VZV ORF-61, BZLF1 is modified by SUMO-1 and disrupts PML Nuclear Bodies. |
| HHV-5 | Cytomegalovirus (CMV) | IE1, IE72 | Disrupts PML bodies in a manner similar to ICP0. |

== See also ==
- ICP-47
