= HSV epigenetics =

Epigenetic modification of HSV genetic code

HSV epigenetics is the epigenetic modification of herpes simplex virus (HSV) genetic code.

As of 2012, an estimated 3.7 billion people globally were infected with oral herpes simplex virus (HSV-1), and 417 million were living with genital herpes (HSV-2) worldwide (World Health Organization, 2018). In severe cases, HSV infection can cause corneal scarring and blindness from herpes keratitis, central nervous system infections, and even death in immunocompromised individuals such as neonates and HIV patients.

== Infectious cycle ==
The life cycle of a virus typically consists of its entry, replication, and eventual shedding. Upon initial infection, herpes simplex virus (HSV) causes acute lytic infection of epithelial cells, usually at either genital or orolabial mucous membranes. During this initial infection, the virus also infects local nerve cells, such as in the trigeminal ganglion in the case of HSV-1. HSV enters the cell when its membrane fuses with the cellular membrane, releasing tegument proteins and the naked capsid into the cytoplasm. The capsid travels to a nuclear pore, likely along cytoskeletal microtubules. The HSV genome is then injected into the nucleus where it is assembled with histones and undergoes chromatin remodeling, thus inducing latency. Lysogenic DNA viruses in particular make use of cellular epigenetic mechanisms in their life cycle, particularly prior to replication, during a virus' latent infection. During latency, most viral genes are silenced, and infected individuals are asymptomatic. More importantly, during latency, proviral DNA is hidden from the immune system, making treatment extremely difficult, if not impossible.

Latent infection is described as the dormancy of a virus, by which proliferation of viral particles cease, yet the viral genome still remains incorporated as reservoirs within the cell. Although diversity among viruses' latent phase exist, ranging from selective viral gene expression (e.g., HSV expression of latency associated transcripts) to complete lack of expression, incorporation into the cell's genome (such as in retroviruses), and episomal persistence, common generalities too can be ascribed. Generally, the long-term latency of a mammalian virus is a dynamic interaction between it and the host cell's antiviral immunity. The establishment, maintenance, and reactivation of the infection cycle (reversibility) largely relies on cellular epigenetic processes in this dynamic and thus opens a discussion for viral treatment via an epigenetic perspective.

== History of treatment ==
Antiviral drug development has been a complex process utilizing several different fields to synthesize single methods of treatment. As of May 2018 there are about 50 drugs approved for human use against viruses such as HSV, HIV, cytomegalovirus, influenza virus, HBV and HCV. A large amount of viral research in the field of epigenetics has been done on specifically on HSV.

HSV infections have been medically recorded in literature for centuries, but its antiviral treatment has been developed only over the past 50 years. The framework for antiviral HSV treatment began with the experimental use of DNA inhibitors, which interrupt the viral replication cycle. These drugs since have been developed commercially and are subsequently prescribed depending on factors such as the immune status of the host, the site of infection, and whether the infection is primary (initial infection) or recurrent (recurring symptoms).

Popular, current antiviral agents include aciclovir, penciclovir, foscarnet, and docosanol. Aciclovir acts as a nucleoside analog which specifically target herpes virus-infected cells using viral thymidine kinase (TK). Viral TK phosphorylates aciclovir into its monophosphate form, which is subsequently phosphorylated to active aciclovir triphoshate by cellular kinases, thus selectively inhibiting viral DNA polymerase. The related valaciclovir Aciclovir triphosphate is the L-valine ester prodrug of aciclovir, which is thus converted to aciclovir in the liver.

Penciclovir is similar to aciclovir in mechanism, except that penciclovir is a guanosine analog. Penciclovir triphosphate is 100-fold less potent in inhibiting viral DNA polymerase, yet also remains in infected cells at higher concentrations and for longer periods of time. Famciclovir is the diacetyl ester prodrug of penciclovir.

Foscarnet does not rely on TK phosphorylation, and is thus potent against TK-deficient HSV isolates which otherwise form a resistant to TK-dependent drug mechanisms. Docosanol (Abreva) blocks initial viral entry via inhibition of fusion between the host plasma membrane and HSV envelope.

As seen by most mainstream antiviral agents, the mechanism of treatment for HSV historically is via the inhibition of viral replication using nucleotides that inhibit DNA polymerase. The specificity in targeting for viral polymerases is dependent on the drug used, which in turn is dependent on the severity of the infection.

== Viral epigenetic mechanisms ==
Epigenetic down-regulation of viral gene expression is likely a result, at least in part, of the evolutionary arms race in which a cellular host attempts to silence viral DNA, such as through chromatin remodeling. However, some viruses have evolved to twist this process to their own advantage by establishing latency. Latent proviral DNA exists as heterochromatin in the host nucleus, evading cellular defenses. Four epigenetic processes have been well described: chromatin assembly, histone modifications, DNA methylation, and regulatory RNA.

Upon initial infection, viral genomes are not associated with histones. Typical double-stranded DNA viruses that infect eukaryotic cells insert their genome into the cell nucleus, where cellular machinery necessary for DNA replication and transcription is present (the notable exceptions are pox viruses, which remain in the cytoplasm). Once viral DNA enters the nucleus, it colocalizes with promyelocytic leukaemia nuclear bodies (PML-NBs), regions rich in proteins associated with antiviral pathways such as PML, SP100, Daxx, and ATRX. In particular, Daxx and ATRX assemble viral DNA around histone 3, forming heterochromatin and silencing viral gene expression. Viral responses have evolved to either degrade or modify this heterochromatin, such as repurposing to induce latency.

There are several known examples of viral recruitment of cellular proteins to chromatin for histone modification, particularly in herpesviridae. (Polycomb complex recruitment by LAT, VP16 recruits OCT1 and HCF1, which in turn recruit histone demethylases JMJD2s and LSD1, etc).

DNA methylation can occur on viral genomes through recruitment of cellular machinery such as DNA methyltransferase 3A (DNMT3A). DNMT3A is a de novo methyltransferase which can methylate previously unmethylated DNA, such as that of viral genomes. DNMT3A is recruited to viral genomes by viral proteins such as the Kaposi's Sarcoma herpesvirus (KSHV) protein LANA, and VP26 and VP5 in herpes simplex virus 1 (HSV-1). Methylation of gene promoters represses gene expression, which has several functions in maintaining latency and even reactivation in Epstein-Barr virus (EBV).

In HSV and Kaposi's Sarcoma-associated herpesvirus (KSHV), the Latency-Associated Transcripts (LATs), which are non-coding RNAs, are thought to play an important role in recruiting host Polycomb proteins to lytic cycle-associated genes on the viral genome. This results in the methylation of cytosines within the promoter region of genes associated with lytic cycle processes. In the gammaherpesvirus Epstein-Barr virus (EBV), the non-coding RNA EBER2 has been implicated in gene regulation. EBER2 recruits PAX5, a transcription factor, to immediate-early genes to promote latency.

Reactivation in HSV requires the stress response enzyme c-Jun N-terminal kinase (JNK), which is responsive to stressors such as heat shock, ultraviolet radiation, and cytokine production. Activation of JNK leads to the expression of viral genes of all temporal classes (immediate early, early, and late) by phosphorylating H3, effectively bypassing the latent repression markers (methylation). Next, the de novo translation of VP16 results in the temporal regulation of these genes; VP16 associates with Oct-1 and with viral promoters to regulate transcription. Reactivation results in lytic infection of proximal epithelial cells.

== Potential therapeutic applications ==
Mammalian viral treatment within the scope of epigenetics is a relatively novel approach that has only seen theoretical or laboratory significance, and as such, advancements in chromatin-based viral therapy relies on advancement in knowledge of viral-host chromatin dynamics and interplay. Two major therapies that target epigenetic machinery have been proposed for treatment of viral infections: inhibition of Ezh1/2 and m^{6}A addition to viral mRNA.

=== Ezh1/2 inhibition ===
Ezh1 and Ezh2 (Ezh1/2) are two homologous enzymes of Ezh histone methyltransferase, and are part of the Polycomb repression complex 2 (PRC2), which functions to repress gene transcription by propagating a H3K27 trimethylation. Ezh1/2 has been implicated in suppression of viral replication during lytic infection.

The Ezh1/2 inhibitors GSK126, GSK343, and UNC1999 as well as astemizole, which interferes with Ezh1/2 association in PRC, were shown by Arbuckle et al. to limit HSV immediate early gene expression and the number of transcriptionally active viral genomes during lytic infection. This resulted in suppression of lytic infection.

Ezh1/2 inhibitors also activate cellular antiviral pathways. Specifically, in cells treated with Ezh1/2 inhibitors, greater numbers of promyelocytic leukemia (PML) foci, which are involved with repression of gene expression, were seen, along with upregulation of interferon-alpha (IFN-α) and interleukin-8 (IL-8). These pathways are not specific to HSV; treatment with Ezh1/2 inhibitors reduced infection of multiple viral pathogens, including human cytomegalovirus, adenovirus, and Zika virus.

=== Adenosine methylation ===
Methylation on the N^{6} position of adenosine (m^{6}A) on messenger RNA (mRNA) affects gene expression by changing mRNA splicing, stability, and translation. These changes favor viral gene expression, though the mechanism for this effect is not known. Importantly, m^{6}A has been proposed to inhibit host immune recognition of viral RNAs. Inhibition of m^{6}A addition by 3-deazaadenosine (DAA) (an S-adenosylhomocysteine hydrolase inhibitor) has been shown to have broad antiviral applications. Therapies utilizing specific m^{6}A may be very effective against nuclear viruses without toxicity to the host, though this research is new.
