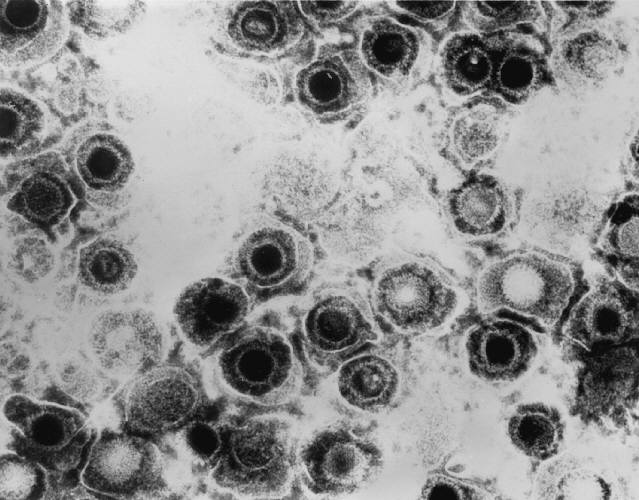
- TEM micrograph of virions of a herpes simplex virus species

Scientific classification
- (unranked): Virus
- Realm: Duplodnaviria
- Kingdom: Heunggongvirae
- Phylum: Peploviricota
- Class: Herviviricetes
- Order: Herpesvirales
- Family: Orthoherpesviridae
- Subfamily: Alphaherpesvirinae
- Genus: Simplexvirus

Groups included
- Simplexvirus humanalpha1; Simplexvirus humanalpha2

Cladistically included but traditionally excluded taxa
- All other Simplexvirus species

= Herpes simplex virus =

Herpes simplex viruses

Species of virus

Herpes simplex virus 1 and 2 (HSV-1 and HSV-2) are two members of the human Herpesviridae family, known for establishing lifelong viral infection in humans. The virus is characterized with long periods of dormancy and immune evasion. This is interspersed with sporadic reactivation, subsequent viral shedding, and consequent infection of new hosts. Infection is typically asymptomatic, though in rare cases is known for inducing cold sores, blindness, and/or encephalitis.

Herpes simplex virus has been recorded since the advent of human writing systems. As of 2016, about 67% of the world population under the age of 50 had HSV-1, with rates being greatest in urban centers. Because it can be transmitted through any intimate contact, it is one of the most common sexually transmitted infections.

== Symptoms ==
Many of those who are infected never develop symptoms. Symptoms, when they occur, may include watery blisters in the skin of any location of the body, or in mucous membranes of the mouth, lips, nose, genitals, or eyes (herpes simplex keratitis). Lesions heal with a scab characteristic of herpetic disease. Sometimes, the viruses cause mild or atypical symptoms during outbreaks. However, they can also cause more troublesome forms of herpes simplex. As neurotropic and neuroinvasive viruses, HSV-1 and -2 persist in the body by hiding from the immune system in the cell bodies of neurons, particularly in sensory ganglia. After the initial or primary infection, some infected people experience sporadic episodes of viral reactivation or outbreaks. In an outbreak, the virus in a nerve cell becomes active and is transported via the neuron's axon to the skin, where virus replication and shedding occur and may cause new sores.

== Transmission ==
HSV-1 and HSV-2 are transmitted by contact with an infected person who has reactivations of the virus. HSV-1 and HSV-2 are periodically shed, most often asymptomatically.

In a study of people with first-episode genital HSV-1 infection from 2022, genital shedding of HSV-1 was detected on 12% of days at 2 months and declined significantly to 7% of days at 11 months. Most genital shedding was asymptomatic; genital and oral lesions and oral shedding were rare.

Most sexual transmissions of HSV-2 occur during periods of asymptomatic shedding. Asymptomatic reactivation means that the virus causes atypical, subtle, or hard-to-notice symptoms that are not identified as an active herpes infection, so acquiring the virus is possible even if no active HSV blisters or sores are present. In one study, daily genital swab samples detected HSV-2 at a median of 12–28% of days among those who had an outbreak, and 10% of days among those with asymptomatic infection (no prior outbreaks), with many of these episodes occurring without visible outbreak ("subclinical shedding").

In another study, 73 subjects were randomized to receive valaciclovir 1 g daily or placebo for 60 days each in a two-way crossover design. A daily swab of the genital area was self-collected for HSV-2 detection by polymerase chain reaction, to compare the effect of valaciclovir versus placebo on asymptomatic viral shedding in immunocompetent, HSV-2 seropositive subjects without a history of symptomatic genital herpes infection. The study found that valaciclovir significantly reduced shedding during subclinical days compared to placebo, showing a 71% reduction; 84% of subjects had no shedding while receiving valaciclovir versus 54% of subjects on placebo. About 88% of patients treated with valaciclovir had no recognized signs or symptoms versus 77% for placebo.

For HSV-2, subclinical shedding may account for most of the transmission. Studies on discordant partners (one infected with HSV-2, one not) show that the transmission rate is approximately 5–8.9 per 10,000 sexual contacts, with condom usage greatly reducing the risk of acquisition. Atypical symptoms are often attributed to other causes, such as a yeast infection. HSV-1 is often acquired orally during childhood. It may also be sexually transmitted, including contact with saliva, such as kissing and oral sex. Historically HSV-2 was primarily a sexually transmitted infection, but rates of HSV-1 genital infections have been increasing for the last few decades.

Both viruses may also be transmitted vertically during natural childbirth. However, the risk of transmission is minimal if the mother has no symptoms nor exposed blisters during delivery. The risk is considerable when the mother is infected with the virus for the first time during late pregnancy, reflecting a high viral load.

Herpes simplex virus (HSV) is highly unstable outside the human body. Although short-term survival on surfaces has been demonstrated under laboratory conditions, the virus rapidly loses infectivity once exposed to air. Consequently, transmission via inanimate objects such as towels or toilet seats is generally considered extremely unlikely. HSV transmission occurs primarily through direct contact with infected skin or mucosa, not through shared objects.

Herpes simplex viruses can affect areas of skin exposed to contact with an infected person. An example of this is herpetic whitlow, which is a herpes infection on the fingers; it was commonly found on dental surgeon's hands before the routine use of gloves when treating patients. Shaking hands with an infected person does not transmit this disease. Genital infection of HSV-2 increases the risk of acquiring HIV.

== Virology ==
HSV has been a model virus for many studies in molecular biology. For instance, one of the first functional promoters in eukaryotes was discovered in HSV (of the thymidine kinase gene) and the virion protein VP16 is one of the most-studied transcriptional activators.

=== Viral structure ===
A three-dimensional reconstruction and animation of a tail-like assembly on HSV-1 capsid

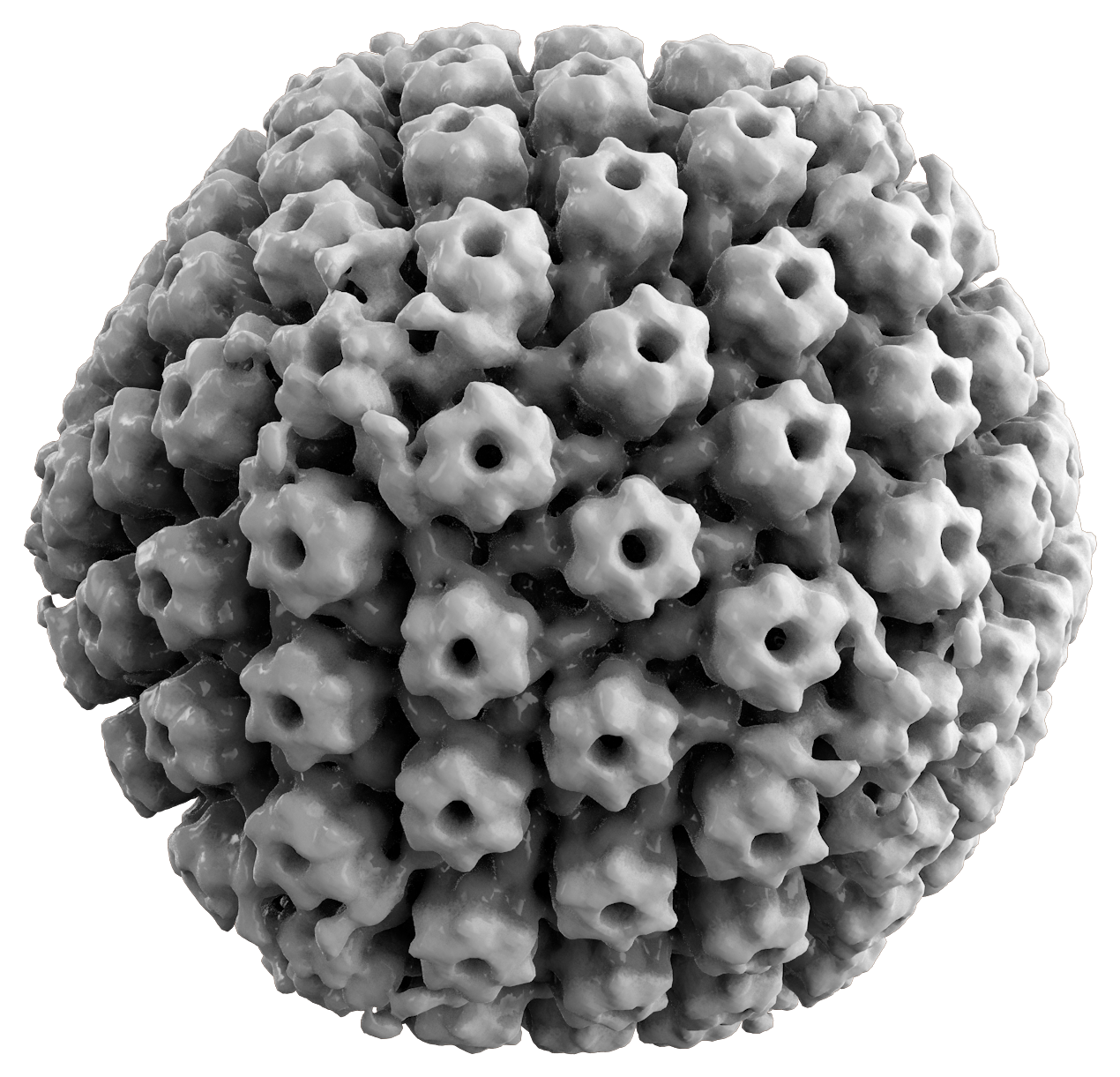
3D reconstruction of the HSV-1 capsid

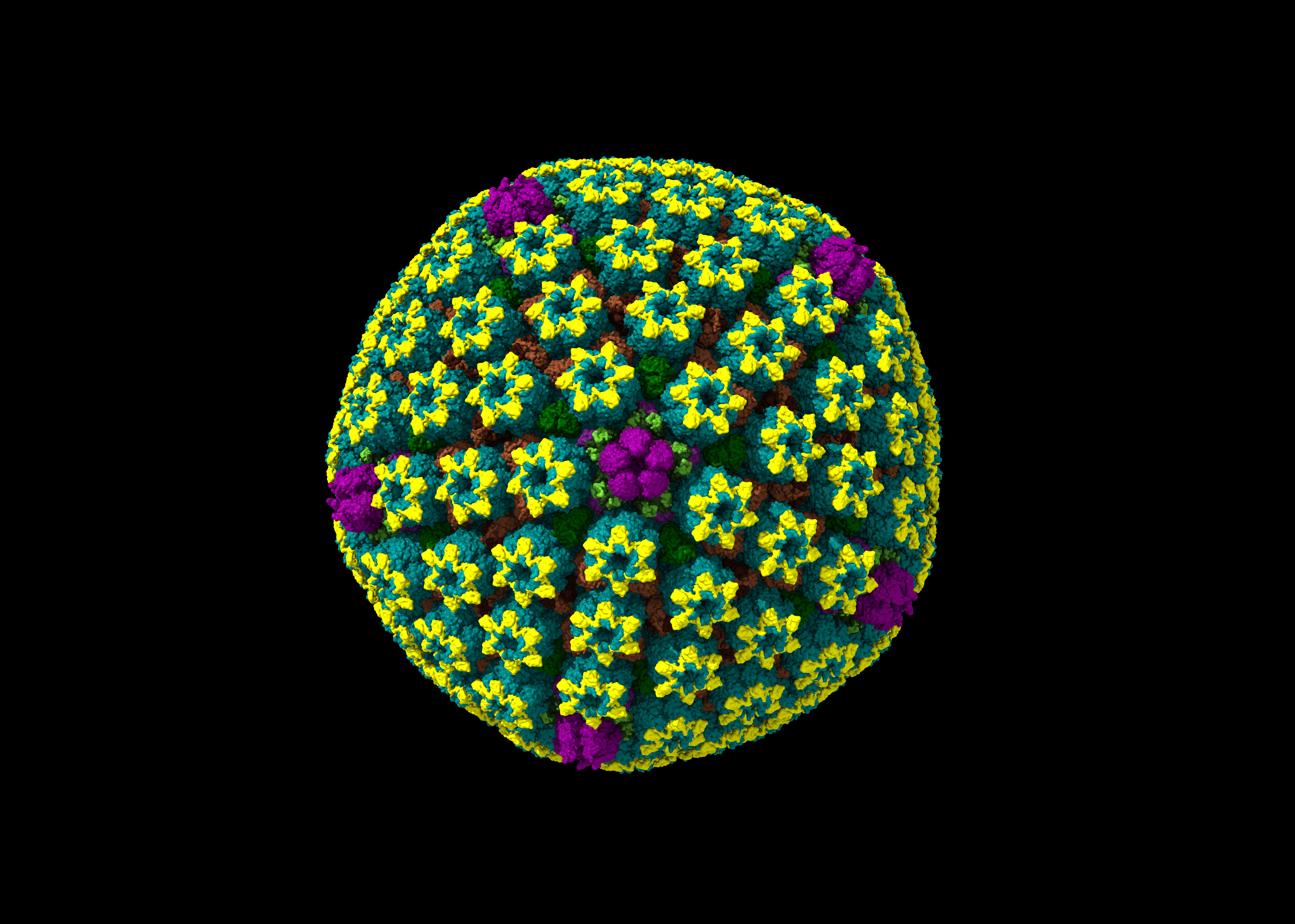
Herpes simplex virus 2 capsid

Animal herpes viruses all share some common properties. The structure of herpes viruses consists of a relatively large, double-stranded, linear DNA genome encased within an icosahedral protein cage called the capsid, which is wrapped in a lipid bilayer called the envelope. The envelope is joined to the capsid through a tegument. This complete particle is known as the virion. HSV-1 and HSV-2 each contain at least 74 genes (or open reading frames, ORFs) within their genomes, although speculation over gene crowding allows as many as 84 unique protein coding genes by 94 putative ORFs. These genes encode a variety of proteins involved in forming the capsid, tegument and envelope of the virus, as well as controlling the replication and infectivity of the virus. These genes and their functions are summarized in the table below.

The genomes of HSV-1 and HSV-2 are complex and contain two unique regions called the long unique region (U_{L}) and the short unique region (U_{S}). Of the 74 known ORFs, U_{L} contains 56 viral genes, whereas U_{S} contains only 12. Transcription of HSV genes is catalyzed by RNA polymerase II of the infected host. Immediate early genes, which encode proteins, for example, ICP22 that regulate the expression of early and late viral genes, are the first to be expressed following infection. Early gene expression follows, to allow the synthesis of enzymes involved in DNA replication and the production of certain envelope glycoproteins. Expression of late genes occurs last; this group of genes predominantly encodes proteins that form the virion particle.

Five proteins from (U_{L}) form the viral capsid - UL6, UL18, UL35, UL38, and the major capsid protein UL19.

=== Cellular entry ===
A simplified diagram of HSV replication

Entry of HSV into a host cell involves several glycoproteins on the surface of the enveloped virus binding to their transmembrane receptors on the cell surface. Many of these receptors are then pulled inwards by the cell, which is thought to open a ring of three gHgL heterodimers stabilizing a compact conformation of the gB glycoprotein so that it springs out and punctures the cell membrane. The envelope covering the virus particle then fuses with the cell membrane, creating a pore through which the contents of the viral envelope enters the host cell.

The sequential stages of HSV entry are analogous to those of other viruses. At first, complementary receptors on the virus and the cell surface bring the viral and cell membranes into proximity. Interactions of these molecules then form a stable entry pore through which the viral envelope contents are introduced to the host cell. The virus can also be endocytosed after binding to the receptors, and the fusion could occur at the endosome. In electron micrographs, the outer leaflets of the viral and cellular lipid bilayers have been seen merged; this hemifusion may be on the usual path to entry or it may usually be an arrested state more likely to be captured than a transient entry mechanism.

In the case of a herpes virus, initial interactions occur when two viral envelope glycoproteins called glycoprotein C (gC) and glycoprotein B (gB) bind to a cell surface polysaccharide called heparan sulfate. Next, the major receptor binding protein, glycoprotein D (gD), binds specifically to at least one of three known entry receptors. These cell receptors include herpesvirus entry mediator (HVEM), nectin-1 and 3-O sulfated heparan sulfate. The nectin receptors usually produce cell-cell adhesion, to provide a strong point of attachment for the virus to the host cell. These interactions bring the membrane surfaces into mutual proximity and allow for other glycoproteins embedded in the viral envelope to interact with other cell surface molecules. Once bound to the HVEM, gD changes its conformation and interacts with viral glycoproteins H (gH) and L (gL), which form a complex. The interaction of these membrane proteins may result in a hemifusion state. gB interaction with the gH/gL complex creates an entry pore for the viral capsid. gB interacts with glycosaminoglycans on the surface of the host cell.

=== Genetic inoculation ===
After the viral capsid enters the cellular cytoplasm, it starts to express viral protein ICP27. ICP27 is a regulator protein that causes disruption in host protein synthesis and utilizes it for viral replication. ICP27 binds with a cellular enzyme Serine-Arginine Protein Kinase 1, SRPK1. Formation of this complex causes the SRPK1 shift from the cytoplasm to the nucleus, and the viral genome gets transported to the cell nucleus. Once attached to the nucleus at a nuclear entry pore, the capsid ejects its DNA contents via the capsid portal. The capsid portal is formed by 12 copies of the portal protein, UL6, arranged as a ring; the proteins contain a leucine zipper sequence of amino acids, which allow them to adhere to each other. Each icosahedral capsid contains a single portal, located in one vertex. The DNA exits the capsid in a single linear segment.

=== Host cell chromatin changes and molecular hijacking ===
During lytic infection, HSV-1 can substantially alter host chromatin organization. Infections have been shown to induce global compaction of host chromatin and its redistribution toward the nuclear periphery. While viral DNA accumulates in viral replication compartments (VRCs). Within these compartments the virus recruits host transcriptional and topological machinery, including RNA polymerase II, Topoisomerase I, and the Cohesin complex, effectively sequestering them from host genes. This redistribution correlates with reduced host transcription and disruption of higher-order chromatin features such as chromatin loops and Topologically associating domains (TADs), although the broader separation between euchromatin and heterochromatin compartments is largely maintained.

=== Immune evasion ===
HSV evades the immune system through interference with MHC class I antigen presentation on the cell surface, by blocking the transporter associated with antigen processing (TAP) induced by the secretion of ICP-47 by HSV. In the host cell, TAP transports digested viral antigen epitope peptides from the cytosol to the endoplasmic reticulum, allowing these epitopes to be combined with MHC class I molecules and presented on the surface of the cell. Viral epitope presentation with MHC class I is a requirement for the activation of cytotoxic T-lymphocytes (CTLs), the major effectors of the cell-mediated immune response against virally infected cells. ICP-47 prevents the initiation of a CTL-response against HSV, allowing the virus to survive for a protracted period in the host. HSV usually produces cytopathic effect (CPE) within 24–72 hours post-infection in permissive cell lines which is observed by classical plaque formation. However, HSV-1 clinical isolates have also been reported that did not show any CPE in Vero and A549 cell cultures over several passages with low levels of virus protein expression. Probably these HSV-1 isolates are evolving towards a more "cryptic" form to establish chronic infection thereby unravelling yet another strategy to evade the host immune system, besides neuronal latency.

=== Replication ===
Herpes simplex cytopathic effects on a cervical Pap test: multinucleation, nuclear molding, chromatin margination, and a Cowdry type A inclusion. Accompanying neutrophils are common but nonspecific.

Following the infection of a cell, a cascade of herpes virus proteins, called immediate-early, early, and late, is produced. Research using flow cytometry on another member of the herpes virus family, Kaposi's sarcoma-associated herpesvirus, indicates the possibility of an additional lytic stage, delayed-late. These stages of lytic infection, particularly late lytic, are distinct from the latency stage. In the case of HSV-1, no protein products are detected during latency, whereas they are detected during the lytic cycle.

The early proteins transcribed are used in the regulation of genetic replication of the virus. On entering the cell, an α-TIF protein joins the viral particle and aids in immediate-early transcription. The virion host shutoff protein (VHS or UL41) is very important to viral replication. This enzyme shuts off protein synthesis in the host, degrades host mRNA, helps in viral replication, and regulates gene expression of viral proteins. The viral genome immediately travels to the nucleus, but the VHS protein remains in the cytoplasm.

The late proteins form the capsid and the receptors on the surface of the virus. Packaging of the viral particles — including the genome, core, and capsid - occurs in the nucleus of the cell. Here, concatemers of the viral genome are separated by cleavage and are placed into formed capsids.

=== Assembly ===
HSV-1 undergoes a process of primary and secondary envelopment. The primary envelope is acquired by budding into the inner nuclear membrane of the cell. This then fuses with the outer nuclear membrane. The virus acquires its final envelope by budding into cytoplasmic vesicles.

Diagram of HSV-1 assembly and the potential recruitment of ESCRT machinery

The virus can’t make its own cutting tools, so it borrows them from host cells. These molecular machinery, called ESCRT, normally help cells divide into two or recycle worn-out parts. The virus relies on one particular part of the toolkit, a group of proteins called CHMP4A/B/C. When blocking CHMP4, almost no new viruses leave the cell.

=== Latent infection ===
HSVs may persist in a quiescent but persistent form known as latent infection, notably in neural ganglia. HSV-1 tends to reside in the trigeminal ganglia, while HSV-2 tends to reside in the sacral ganglia, but these are historical tendencies only. During latent infection of a cell, the HSV genome circular DNA resides within the cellular nucleus as an non-integrated nucleosome-associated episome.

HSVs express latency-associated transcript (LAT) RNA. Though LAT is not known to encode a pro-latency regulatory protein, LAT has still been associated with preserving latency and facilitating reactivation. LAT suppresses lytic gene expression in murine models. This repression promotes neuronal cell survival, theorized to be due to repression of type I IFN responses through downregulation of the JAK-STAT pathway. The deposition of euchromatic marks are greatest in regions surrounding LAT in the latent episome, indicating chromatin regulation is important for maintaining latent infection. Though LAT is non-essential for entry into latency, viral strains lacking LAT have cell type-dependent difficulties undergoing early reactivation. Ultimately, by maintaining the host cells, LAT expression preserves a perpetual latent reservoir of the virus, from where subsequent outbreaks emerge during the host lifespan.

A protein found in neurons may bind to herpes virus DNA and regulate latency. Herpes virus DNA contains a gene for a protein called ICP4, which is an important transactivator of genes associated with lytic infection in HSV-1. Elements surrounding the gene for ICP4 bind a protein known as the human neuronal protein neuronal restrictive silencing factor (NRSF) or human repressor element silencing transcription factor (REST). When bound to the viral DNA elements, histone deacetylation occurs atop the ICP4 gene sequence to prevent initiation of transcription from this gene, thereby preventing transcription of other viral genes involved in the lytic cycle. Another HSV protein reverses the inhibition of ICP4 protein synthesis. ICP0 dissociates NRSF from the ICP4 gene and thus prevents silencing of the viral DNA.

=== Genome ===
The HSV genome spans about 150,000 bp and consists of two unique segments, named unique long (UL) and unique short (US), as well as terminal inverted repeats found to the two ends of them named repeat long (RL) and repeat short (RS). There are also minor "terminal redundancy" (α) elements found on the further ends of RS. The overall arrangement is RL-UL-RL-α-RS-US-RS-α with each pair of repeats inverting each other. The whole sequence is then encapsulated in a terminal direct repeat. The long and short parts each have their own origins of replication, with OriL located between UL28 and UL30 and OriS located in a pair near the RS. As the L and S segments can be assembled in any direction, they can be inverted relative to each other freely, forming various linear isomers.

The open reading frames (ORFs) of HSV
ORF	Protein alias	HSV-1	HSV-2	Function/description
Repeat long (R_{L})
ICP0/RL2	ICP0; IE110; α0	P08393	P28284	E3 ubiquitin ligase that activates viral gene transcription by opposing chromatinization of the viral genome and counteracts intrinsic- and interferon-based antiviral responses.
RL1	RL1; ICP34.5	O12396	P28283	Neurovirulence factor. Antagonizes PKR by de-phosphorylating eIF4a. Binds to BECN1 and inactivates autophagy.
LAT	LRP1, LRP2	P17588; P17589		Latency-associated transcript abd protein products (latency-related protein)
Unique long (U_{L})
UL1	Glycoprotein L	P10185	P28278	Surface and membrane
UL2	Uracil-DNA glycosylase	P10186	P13158 P28275	Uracil-DNA glycosylase
UL3	UL3	P10187 Q1XBW5	P0C012 P28279	unknown
UL4	UL4	P10188	P28280	unknown
UL5	HELI	P10189	P28277	DNA helicase
UL6	Portal protein U_{L}-6	P10190		Twelve of these proteins constitute the capsid portal ring through which DNA enters and exits the capsid.
UL7	Cytoplasmic envelopment protein 1	P10191	P89430	Virion maturation
UL8	DNA helicase/primase complex-associated protein	P10192	P89431	DNA virus helicase-primase complex-associated protein
UL9	Replication origin-binding protein	P10193	P89432	Replication origin-binding protein
UL10	Glycoprotein M	P04288	P89433	Surface and membrane
UL11	Cytoplasmic envelopment protein 3	P04289 Q68980	P13294	virion exit and secondary envelopment
UL12	Alkaline nuclease	P04294	P06489	Alkaline exonuclease
UL13	UL13	P04290	P89436	Serine-threonine protein kinase
UL14	UL14	P04291	P89437	Tegument protein
UL15	TRM3	P04295	P89438	Processing and packaging of DNA
UL16	UL16	P10200	P89439	Tegument protein
UL17	CVC1	P10201		Processing and packaging DNA
UL18	TRX2	P10202	P89441	Capsid protein
UL19	VP5; ICP5	P06491	P89442	Major capsid protein
UL20	UL20	P10204	P89443	Membrane protein
UL21	UL21	P10205 P09855	P89444	Tegument protein
UL22	Glycoprotein H	P06477	P89445	Surface and membrane
UL23	Thymidine kinase	O55259		Peripheral to DNA replication
UL24	UL24	P10208		unknown
UL25	UL25	P10209		Processing and packaging DNA
UL26	P40; VP24; VP22A; UL26.5 (HHV2 short isoform)	P10210	P89449	Capsid protein
UL27	Glycoprotein B	A1Z0P5	P08666	Surface and membrane
UL28	ICP18.5	P10212		Processing and packaging DNA
UL29	UL29; ICP8	Q2MGU6		Major DNA-binding protein
UL30	DNA polymerase	Q4ACM2		DNA replication
UL31	UL31	Q25BX0		Nuclear matrix protein
UL32	UL32	P10216		Envelope glycoprotein
UL33	UL33	P10217		Processing and packaging DNA
UL34	UL34	P10218		Inner nuclear membrane protein
UL35	VP26	P10219		Capsid protein
UL36	UL36	P10220		Large tegument protein
UL37	UL37	P10216		Capsid assembly
UL38	UL38; VP19C	P32888		Capsid assembly and DNA maturation
UL39	UL39; RR-1; ICP6	P08543		Ribonucleotide reductase (large subunit)
UL40	UL40; RR-2	P06474		Ribonucleotide reductase (small subunit)
UL41	UL41; VHS	P10225		Tegument protein; virion host shutoff
UL42	UL42	Q4H1G9		DNA polymerase processivity factor
UL43	UL43	P10227		Membrane protein
UL44	Glycoprotein C	P10228	Q89730	Surface and membrane
UL45	UL45	P10229		Membrane protein; C-type lectin
UL46	VP11/12	P08314		Tegument proteins
UL47	UL47; VP13/14	P10231		Tegument protein
UL48	VP16 (Alpha-TIF)	P04486	P68336	Virion maturation; activate IE genes by interacting with the cellular transcription factors Oct-1 and HCF. Binds to the sequence ^{5'}TAATGARAT^{3'}.
UL49	UL49A	O09800		Envelope protein
UL50	UL50	P10234		dUTP diphosphatase
UL51	UL51	P10234		Tegument protein
UL52	UL52	P10236		DNA helicase/primase complex protein
UL53	Glycoprotein K	P68333		Surface and membrane
UL54	IE63; ICP27	P10238		Transcriptional regulation and inhibition of the STING signalsome
UL55	UL55	P10239		Unknown
UL56	UL56	P10240		Unknown
Inverted repeat long (IR_{L})
Inverted repeat short (IR_{S})
Unique short (U_{S})
US1	ICP22; IE68	P04485		Viral replication
US2	US2	P06485		Unknown
US3	US3	P04413		Serine/threonine-protein kinase
US4	Glycoprotein G	P06484	P13290	Surface and membrane
US5	Glycoprotein J	P06480		Surface and membrane
US6	Glycoprotein D	A1Z0Q5	Q69467	Surface and membrane
US7	Glycoprotein I	P06487		Surface and membrane
US8	Glycoprotein E	Q703F0	P89475	Surface and membrane
US9	US9	P06481		Tegument protein
US10	US10	P06486		Capsid/Tegument protein
US11	US11; Vmw21	P56958		Binds DNA and RNA
US12	ICP47; IE12	P03170		Inhibits MHC class I pathway by preventing binding of antigen to TAP
Terminal repeat short (TR_{S})
RS1	ICP4; IE175	P08392		Major transcriptional activator. Essential for progression beyond the immediate-early phase of infection. IEG transcription repressor.

=== Gene expression ===
HSV genes are expressed in 3 temporal classes: immediate early (IE or α), early (E or ß), and late (γ) genes. However, the progression of viral gene expression is rather gradual than in clearly distinct stages. Immediate early genes are transcribed right after infection and their gene products activate transcription of the early genes. Early gene products help to replicate the viral DNA. Viral DNA replication, in turn, stimulates the expression of the late genes, encoding the structural proteins.

Transcription of the immediate early (IE) genes begins right after virus DNA enters the nucleus. All virus genes are transcribed by the host RNA polymerase II. Although host proteins are sufficient for virus transcription, viral proteins are necessary for the transcription of certain genes. For instance, VP16 plays an important role in IE transcription and the virus particle brings it into the host cell, so that it does not need to be produced first. Similarly, the IE proteins RS1 (ICP4), UL54 (ICP27), and ICP0 promote the transcription of the early (E) genes. Like IE genes, early gene promoters contain binding sites for cellular transcription factors. One early protein, ICP8, is necessary for both transcription of late genes and DNA replication.

Later in the life cycle of HSV, the expression of immediate early and early genes is shut down. This is mediated by specific virus proteins, e.g. ICP4, which represses itself by binding to elements in its promoter. As a consequence, the down-regulation of ICP4 levels leads to a reduction of early and late gene expression, as ICP4 is important for both.

Importantly, HSV shuts down host cell RNA, DNA, and protein synthesis to direct cellular resources to virus production. First, the virus protein VHS induces the degradation of existing mRNAs early in infection. Other viral genes impede cellular transcription and translation. For instance, ICP27 inhibits RNA splicing, so that virus mRNAs (which are usually not spliced) gain an advantage over host mRNAs. Finally, virus proteins destabilize certain cellular proteins involved in the host cell cycle, so that both cell division and host cell DNA replication are disturbed in favor of virus replication.

== Evolution ==
Evolutionary models estimate that the ancestor of HSV-1 co-evolved with the common ancestor of humans and chimpanzees roughly six million years ago, while HSV-2 was transmitted to human ancestors roughly 1.6 million years ago when an ancestral strain jumped from ancient chimpanzees to the ancestors of modern humans via cross-species transmission.

The herpes simplex 1 genomes can be classified into six clades. Four of these occur in East Africa, one in East Asia and one in Europe and North America. This suggests that the virus may have originated in East Africa. The most recent common ancestor of the Eurasian strains appears to have evolved ~60,000 years ago. The East Asian HSV-1 isolates have an unusual pattern that is currently best explained by the two waves of migration responsible for the peopling of Japan.

Paleogenomic research analyzing ancient HSV-1 DNA recovered from European skeletal remains suggests that modern circulating strains share a most recent common ancestor dating back approximately 4,000 years to the late Neolithic period. Historians and geneticists hypothesize that Bronze Age population expansions and changes in social practices, such as kissing, helped drive a lineage replacement event that established the dominant strains found today.

Herpes simplex 2 genomes can be divided into two groups: one is globally distributed and the other is mostly limited to sub Saharan Africa. The globally distributed genotype has undergone four ancient recombinations with herpes simplex 1. It has also been reported that HSV-1 and HSV-2 can have contemporary and stable recombination events in hosts simultaneously infected with both pathogens. All of the cases are HSV-2 acquiring parts of the HSV-1 genome, sometimes changing parts of its antigen epitope in the process.

The mutation rate has been estimated to be ~1.38×10^{−7} substitutions/site/year. In the clinical setting, mutations in either the thymidine kinase gene or DNA polymerase gene have caused resistance to aciclovir. However, most of the mutations occur in the thymidine kinase gene rather than the DNA polymerase gene.

Another analysis has estimated the mutation rate in the herpes simplex 1 genome to be 1.82×10^{−8} nucleotide substitution per site per year. This analysis placed the most recent common ancestor of this virus ~710,000 years ago.

Herpes simplex 1 and 2 diverged about 6 million years ago.

== Treatment ==
Similar to other herpesviridae, the herpes simplex viruses establish latent lifelong infection, and thus cannot be eradicated from the body with current treatments.

Treatment usually involves general-purpose antiviral drugs that interfere with viral replication, reduce the physical severity of outbreak-associated lesions, and lower the chance of transmission to others. Studies of vulnerable patient populations have indicated that daily use of antivirals such as aciclovir and valaciclovir can reduce reactivation rates. The extensive use of antiherpetic drugs has led to the development of some drug resistance, which in turn may lead to treatment failure. Therefore, new sources of drugs are broadly investigated to address the problem. In January 2020, a comprehensive review article was published that demonstrated the potential effectiveness of certain chemicals derived from natural products as promising anti-HSV drugs. Pyrithione, a zinc ionophore, has shown antiviral activity against herpes simplex.

== Alzheimer's disease and dementia ==
In 1979, it was reported that there is a possible link between HSV-1 and Alzheimer's disease, in people with the epsilon4 allele of the gene APOE. HSV-1 appears to be particularly damaging to the nervous system and increases one's risk of developing Alzheimer's disease. The virus interacts with the components and receptors of lipoproteins, which may lead to the development of Alzheimer's disease. This research identifies HSVs as the pathogen most clearly linked to the establishment of Alzheimer's. According to a study done in 1997, without the presence of the gene allele, HSV-1 does not appear to cause any neurological damage or increase the risk of Alzheimer's. However, a more recent prospective study published in 2008 with a cohort of 591 people showed a statistically significant difference between patients with antibodies indicating recent reactivation of HSV and those without these antibodies in the incidence of Alzheimer's disease, without direct correlation to the APOE-epsilon4 allele. The trial had a small sample of patients who did not have the antibody at baseline, so the results should be interpreted carefully.

In 2011, Manchester University scientists showed that treating HSV1-infected cells with antiviral agents decreased the accumulation of β-amyloid and tau protein and also decreased HSV-1 replication.

A 2018 retrospective study from Taiwan on 33,000 patients found that being infected with herpes simplex virus increased the risk of dementia 2.56 times (95% CI: 2.3–2.8) in patients not receiving anti-herpetic medications (2.6 times for HSV-1 infections and 2.0 times for HSV-2 infections). Furthermore, HSV-infected patients who were receiving anti-herpetic medications (e.g., acyclovir, famciclovir, ganciclovir, idoxuridine, penciclovir, tromantadine, valaciclovir, or valganciclovir) showed a decreased risk of dementia compared to those without the treatment (adjusted Hazard Ratio = 0.092 [95% Clearance Interval = 0.079-0.108], p < 0.001).

In 2024, a cohort study of 1002 participants demonstrated a doubled risk of dementia (Hazard ratio = 2.26, Confidence Interval = 1.08–4.72, p = .031) among persons having immunoglobuline G antibodies against HSV, which indicates that an HSV-infection had occurred some time in life, compared to non-infected. This study highlights the importance of investigating the association between HSV-infection and dementia development.

== Multiplicity reactivation ==
Multiplicity reactivation (MR) is the process by which viral genomes containing inactivating damage interact within an infected cell to form a viable viral genome. MR was originally discovered with the bacterial virus bacteriophage T4 but was subsequently also found with pathogenic viruses including influenza virus, HIV-1, adenovirus simian virus 40, vaccinia virus, reovirus, poliovirus, and herpes simplex virus.

When HSV particles are exposed to doses of a DNA-damaging agent that would be lethal in single infections but are then allowed to undergo multiple infections (i.e. two or more viruses per host cell), MR is observed. Enhanced survival of HSV-1 due to MR occurs upon exposure to different DNA damaging agents, including methyl methanesulfonate, trimethylpsoralen (which causes inter-strand DNA cross-links), and UV light. After treatment of genetically marked HSV with trimethylpsoralen, recombination between the marked viruses increases, suggesting that trimethylpsoralen damage stimulates recombination. MR of HSV appears to partially depend on the host cell recombinational repair machinery since skin fibroblast cells defective in a component of this machinery (i.e. cells from Bloom's syndrome patients) are deficient in MR.

These observations suggest that MR in HSV infections involves genetic recombination between damaged viral genomes resulting in the production of viable progeny viruses. HSV-1, upon infecting host cells, induces inflammation and oxidative stress. Thus it appears that the HSV genome may be subjected to oxidative DNA damage during infection, and that MR may enhance viral survival and virulence under these conditions.

== Use as an anti-cancer agent ==
Modified herpes simplex virus is considered as a potential therapy for cancer and has been extensively clinically tested to assess its oncolytic (cancer-killing) ability. Interim overall survival data from Amgen's phase 3 trial of a genetically attenuated herpes virus, published in 2013, suggests efficacy against melanoma.

== Use in neuronal connection tracing ==
Herpes simplex virus is also used as a transneuronal tracer defining connections among neurons by traversing synapses.

== Other related outcomes ==
HSV-2 is the most common cause of Mollaret's meningitis. HSV-1 can lead to potentially fatal cases of herpes simplex encephalitis. Herpes simplex viruses have also been studied in the central nervous system disorders such as multiple sclerosis, but research has been conflicting and inconclusive.

Following a diagnosis of genital herpes simplex infection, patients may develop an episode of profound depression. In addition to offering antiviral medication to alleviate symptoms and shorten their duration, physicians must also address the mental health impact of a new diagnosis. Providing information on the very high prevalence of these infections, their effective treatments, and future therapies in development may provide hope to patients who are otherwise demoralized.

HSV infection of the central nervous system was found to increase all-cause mortality in Denmark: 19.3% excess one-year mortality for HSV-1 and 5.3% for HSV-2 in the first year of infection. Additionally, lower employment rates and higher disability pension rates were observed.

== Research ==
There exist commonly used vaccines to some herpesviruses, such as the veterinary vaccine HVT/LT (Turkey herpesvirus vector laryngotracheitis vaccine). However, it prevents atherosclerosis (which histologically mirrors atherosclerosis in humans) in target animals vaccinated. The only human vaccines available for herpesviruses are for Varicella zoster virus, given to children around their first birthday to prevent chickenpox (varicella), or to adults to prevent an outbreak of shingles (herpes zoster). There is, however, no human vaccine for herpes simplex viruses. As of 2022, there are active pre-clinical and clinical studies underway on herpes simplex in humans; vaccines are being developed for both treatment and prevention.

== See also ==
- HSV epigenetics
