= GSE1 =

Protein

Identifiers
- Aliases: GSE1, KIAA0182, CRHSP24, Gse1 coiled-coil protein
- External IDs: OMIM: 616886; MGI: 1098275; GeneCards: GSE1

Gene location (Human)
Chr.	Chromosome 16 (human)
Band	16q24.1	Start	85,169,525 bp
Band	16q24.1	End	85,676,204 bp

Gene location (Mouse)
Chr.	Chromosome 8 (mouse)
Band	8|8 E1	Start	120,955,195 bp
Band	8|8 E1	End	121,308,129 bp
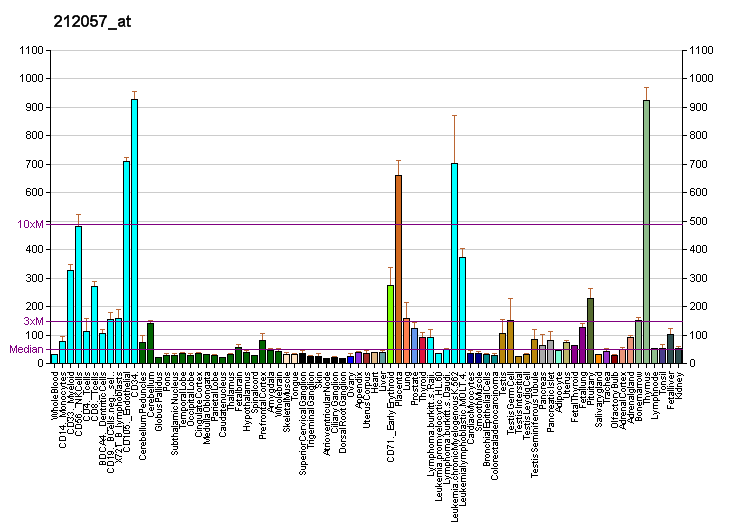

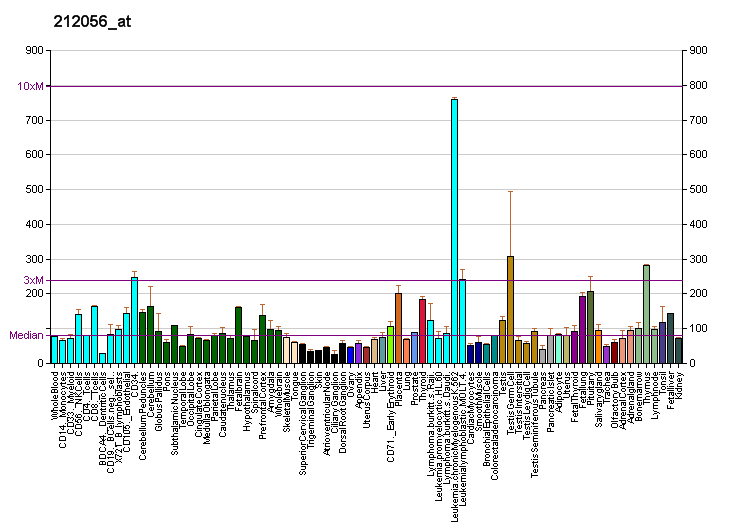
RNA expression pattern
Bgee	Human / Mouse (ortholog); Top expressed in: corpus epididymis; caput epididymis; ganglionic eminence; pylorus; placenta; thymus; cardia; trabecular bone; lower lobe of lung; tail of epididymis / Top expressed in: zygote; suprachiasmatic nucleus; primary oocyte; lateral septal nucleus; thymus; neural layer of retina; dorsomedial hypothalamic nucleus; ganglionic eminence; ventral tegmental area; subiculum; More reference expression data
BioGPS	More reference expression data
Orthologs
Databases	NCBI: entry; OMA: entry
Species	Human	Mouse
Entrez	23199	382034
Ensembl	ENSG00000131149	ENSMUSG00000031822
UniProt	Q14687	Q3U3C9
RefSeq (mRNA)	NM_001134473; NM_001278184; NM_014615	NM_001145896; NM_001145897; NM_198671
RefSeq (protein)	NP_001127945; NP_001265113; NP_055430	NP_001139368; NP_001139369; NP_941073
Location (UCSC)	Chr 16: 85.17 – 85.68 Mb	Chr 8: 120.96 – 121.31 Mb
PubMed search
- Wikidata
View/Edit Human	View/Edit Mouse

Genetic suppressor element 1 is a protein that in humans is encoded by the GSE1 gene. Not much has been reported about the function of GSE1, but it may be a subunit of a BHC histone deacetylase complex, which includes HDAC1, HDAC2, and HMG20B among other protein subunits.
