= PAFE =

PAFE or PafE may refer to:

- the ICAO airport code PAFE for Kake Airport
- Performing Arts for Everyone (PAFE), a program at the John F. Kennedy Center for the Performing Arts
- Proteasome accessory factor E (PafE)
