= PHF21A =

Protein-coding gene in the species Homo sapiens

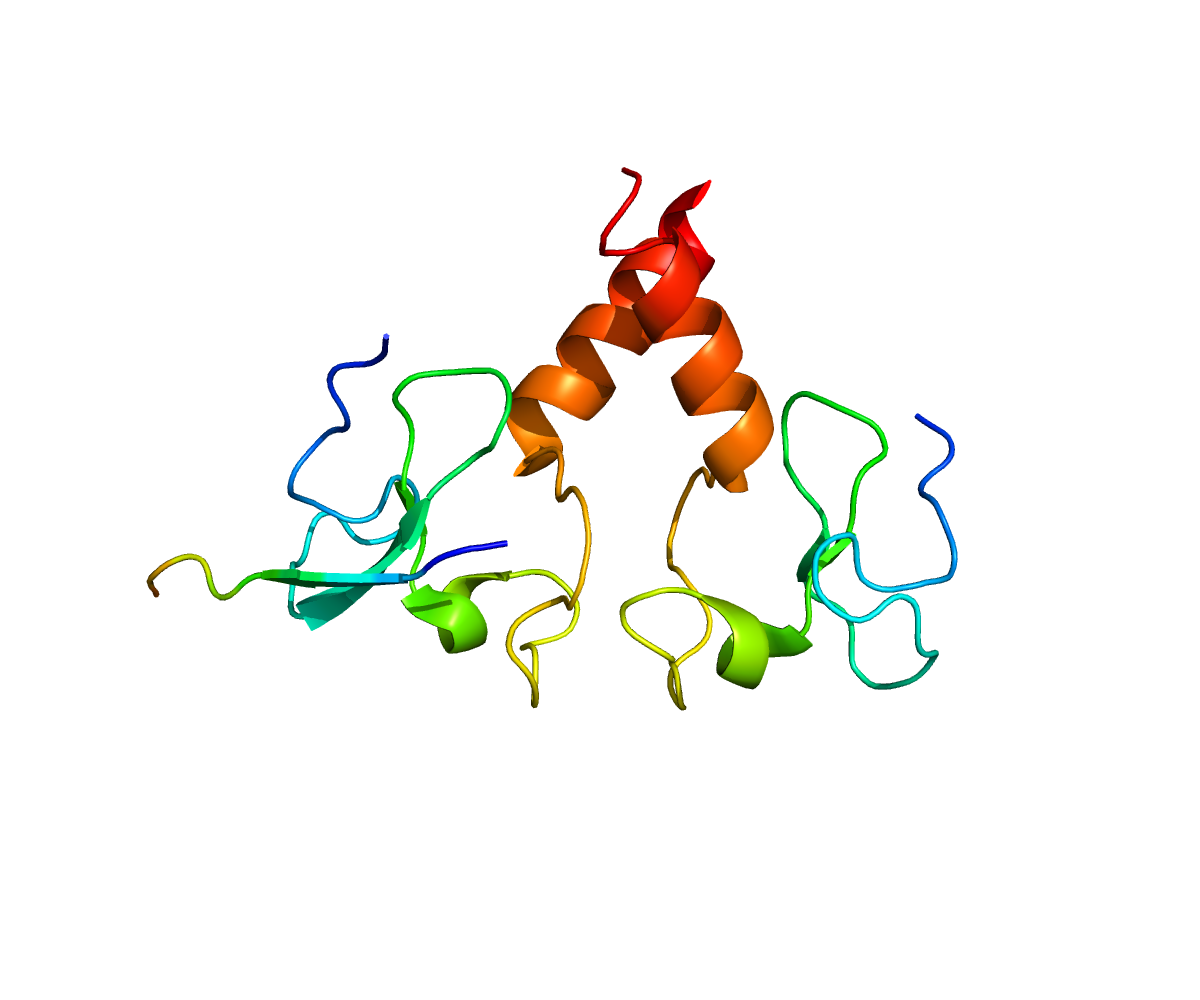

Identifiers
- Aliases: PHF21A, BHC80, BM-006, PHD finger protein 21A, NEDMS, IDDBCS
- External IDs: OMIM: 608325; MGI: 2384756; GeneCards: PHF21A
Available structures
PDB	Ortholog search: PDBe RCSB
PDB	List of PDB id codes 2PUY, 2YQL

Gene location (Human)
Chr.	Chromosome 11 (human)
Band	11p11.2	Start	45,929,319 bp
Band	11p11.2	End	46,121,454 bp

Gene location (Mouse)
Chr.	Chromosome 2 (mouse)
Band	2|2 E1	Start	92,093,117 bp
Band	2|2 E1	End	92,364,666 bp
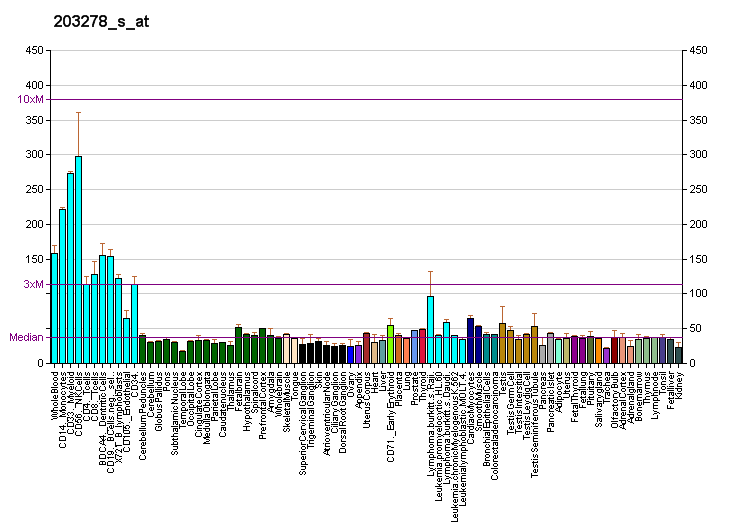
RNA expression pattern
Bgee	Human / Mouse (ortholog); Top expressed in: tendon of biceps brachii; blood; epithelium of colon; ganglionic eminence; monocyte; buccal mucosa cell; sural nerve; granulocyte; ventricular zone; Achilles tendon / Top expressed in: genital tubercle; tail of embryo; Rostral migratory stream; spermatocyte; ventricular zone; medulla of thymus; granulocyte; aortic valve; ascending aorta; saccule; More reference expression data
BioGPS	More reference expression data
Gene ontology
Molecular function	DNA binding; histone binding; RNA polymerase II transcription regulatory region sequence-specific DNA binding; chromatin binding; transcription coregulator activity; protein binding; metal ion binding; histone deacetylase activity
Cellular component	histone deacetylase complex; DNA repair complex; nucleus; nucleoplasm
Biological process	blood coagulation; negative regulation of transcription by RNA polymerase II; transcription, DNA-templated; histone deacetylation; regulation of transcription, DNA-templated; chromatin organization
Sources:Amigo / QuickGO
Orthologs
Databases	NCBI: entry; OMA: entry
Species	Human	Mouse
Entrez	51317	192285
Ensembl	ENSG00000135365	ENSMUSG00000058318
UniProt	Q96BD5	Q6ZPK0
RefSeq (mRNA)	NM_001101802; NM_016621; NM_001352025; NM_001352026; NM_001352027 NM_001352028; NM_001352029; NM_001352030; NM_001352031; NM_001352032	NM_001109690; NM_001109691; NM_138755; NM_001346704; NM_001362829 NM_001362830; NM_001362831; NM_001362832; NM_001362833
RefSeq (protein)	NP_001095272; NP_057705; NP_001338954; NP_001338955; NP_001338956 NP_001338957; NP_001338958; NP_001338959; NP_001338960; NP_001338961	NP_001103160; NP_001103161; NP_001333633; NP_620094; NP_001349758 NP_001349759; NP_001349760; NP_001349761; NP_001349762
Location (UCSC)	Chr 11: 45.93 – 46.12 Mb	Chr 2: 92.09 – 92.36 Mb
PubMed search
- Wikidata
View/Edit Human	View/Edit Mouse

PHD finger protein 21A is a protein that in humans is encoded by the PHF21A gene.

== Function ==
BHC80 is a component of a BRAF35 (MIM 605535)/histone deacetylase (HDAC; see MIM 601241) complex (BHC) that mediates repression of neuron-specific genes through the cis-regulatory element known as repressor element-1 (RE1) or neural restrictive silencer (NRS) (Hakimi et al., 2002).[supplied by OMIM]

== Interactions ==
PHF21A has been shown to interact with:

- HDAC1,
- HMG20B,
- Histone deacetylase 2, and
- RCOR1.
