= HHV capsid portal protein =

Identifiers
- Organism: ?
- Symbol: UL6
- Orthologs: OMA: entry
- UniProt: P10190
Search for
- Structures: Swiss-model
- Domains: InterPro

HHV Capsid Portal Protein, or HSV-1 U_{L}-6 protein, is the protein which forms a cylindrical portal in the capsid of Herpes simplex virus (HSV-1). The protein is commonly referred to as the HSV-1 U_{L}-6 protein because it is the transcription product of Herpes gene U_{L}-6.

The Herpes viral DNA enters and exits the capsid via the capsid portal. The capsid portal is formed by twelve copies of portal protein arranged as a ring; the proteins contain a leucine zipper sequence of amino acids which allow them to adhere to each other. Each icosahedral capsid contains a single portal, located in one vertex.

The portal is formed during initial capsid assembly and interacts with scaffolding proteins that construct the procapsid. When the capsid is nearly complete, the viral DNA enters the capsid (i.e., the DNA is encapsidated) by a mechanism involving the portal and a DNA-binding protein complex similar to bacteriophage terminase. Multiple studies suggest an evolutionary relationship between Capsid Portal Protein and bacteriophage portal proteins.

When a virus infects a cell, it is necessary for the viral DNA to be released from the capsid. The Herpes virus DNA exits through the capsid portal.

The genetic sequence of HSV-1 gene U_{L}-6 is conserved across the family Herpesviridae and this family of genes is known as the "Herpesvirus UL6-like" gene family. "U_{L}-6" is nomenclature meaning that the protein is genetically encoded by the sixth (6th) open reading frame found in the viral genome segment named "Unique-Long (U_{L})".

== Studies ==
Studies by amino acid sequence location
pU_{L}-6 Amino acid range	Summary	Reference
E121, A618, Q621	Point mutations confer resistance to portal assembly inhibitor WAY-150138	van Zeijl, et al., 2000
198-295	Deletion mutant forms immature B-capsids with no portals	Nellissery, et al., 2007
322-416	Deletion mutants form immature B-capsids which do contain portals	Nellissery, et al., 2007
409-473	Deletion mutants form immature B-capsids which do contain portals	Nellissery, et al., 2007
L429, L436	Mutation studies suggest putative leucine zipper required for portal ring formation	Nellissery, et al., 2007
R676	Carboxyl (C)-terminal end	NCBI Sequence
pU_{L}-26.5 "Scaffolding protein" Amino acid range	Summary	Reference
143-151	Deletion inhibits U_{L}-6 portal assembly	Singer, et al., 2005

=== Dodecameric structure ===
Research performed in 2004 used electron microscopy to predict that U_{L}-6 forms 11, 12, 13, and 14-unit polymers. The dodecameric form was found to be most likely.

Refinements to the electron microscopy in 2007 allowed finding that the portal is a twelve (12)-unit polymer present at one of the twelve capsid vertices instead of the U_{L}-19 pentamer found at non-portal vertices.

=== Leucine zipper creates inter-protein adhesion ===
A study using deletion and mutation of the U_{L}-6 amino acid sequence demonstrated the leucine residues in a predicted leucine zipper motif were required for formation of the dodecameric ring structure.

=== Early involvement in capsid assembly ===
Assembly of portal units is an initial step in constructing capsids of viral progeny. Capsids assembled in the absence of portals lack portals.

=== Interaction with capsid scaffolding protein ===
In 2003, gel electrophoresis studies demonstrated that intact U_{L}-6 portals associate in vitro with viral protein U_{L}-26. This association is antagonized by that action of WAY-150138, a thiourea inhibitor of HHV encapsidation.

Further investigation during 2006 showed that assembly of capsid with portal depends on interaction of U_{L}-6 with "scaffolding" protein U_{L}-26.5, amino acids 143 through 151.

=== Interaction with terminase complex ===
U_{L}-6 associates with a U_{L}-15/U_{L}-28 protein complex during capsid assembly. The U_{L}-15/U_{L}-28 is believed to bind with viral DNA and serve the same purpose as terminase by packing viral DNA into the capsid during capsid assembly.

=== Function during DNA egress ===
The DNA exits the capsid in a single linear segment. DNA exit may be controlled by U_{L}-6 and dependent on temperature or environmental proteins.
