= Dodecameric protein =

A dodecameric protein has a quaternary structure consisting of 12 protein subunits in a complex. Dodecameric complexes can have a number of subunit 'topologies', but typically only a few of the theoretically possible subunit arrangements are observed in protein structures.

A dodecamer (protein) is a protein complex with 12 protein subunits.

A common subunit arrangement involves a tetrahedral distribution of subunit trimers (or 3-4-point symmetry). Another observed arrangement of subunits puts two rings of six subunits side by side along the sixfold axis (or 2-6-point symmetry).

== Dodecameric proteins include ==
- Complete gap junction channel, composed of two hexamers.
- glutamine synthetase (PDB code: 2gls)
- Dodecameric ferritin (PDB code: 1qgh)
- Aβ42 - Amyloid-beta 42
- Helicobacter pylori urease
- HHV capsid portal protein

== Propionyl-CoA carboxylase ==
When multiple copies of a polypeptide encoded by a gene form an aggregate, this protein structure is referred to as a multimer. When a multimer is formed from polypeptides produced by two different mutant alleles of a particular gene, the mixed multimer may exhibit greater functional activity than the unmixed multimers formed by each of the mutants alone. In such a case, the phenomenon is referred to as intragenic complementation or interallelic complementation.

Propionyl-CoA carboxylase (PCC) is a dodecameric heteropolymer composed of α and β subunits in a α6β6 structure. Mutations in PCC, either in the α subunit (PCCα) or β subunit (PCCβ) can cause propionic acidemia in humans. When different mutant skin fibroblast cell lines defective in PCCβ were fused in pairwise combinations, the β heteromultimeric protein formed as a result often exhibited a higher level of activity than would be expected based on the activities of the parental enzymes. This finding of intragenic complementation indicated that the multimeric dodecameric structure of PCC allows cooperative interactions between the constituent PCCβ monomers that can generate a more functional form of the holoenzyme.
