= Infected cell protein 47 =

US12

Identifiers
- Symbol: Herpes_US12
- Pfam: PF05363
- InterPro: IPR008026
- CATH: 5U1D
- SCOP2: 1qlo / SCOPe / SUPFAM
Available protein structures:
- PDB: IPR008026 PF05363 (ECOD; PDBsum)
- AlphaFold: IPR008026; PF05363

Infected cell protein 47 also ICP-47 or ICP47 is a protein encoded by the viruses such as Herpes simplex virus and Cytomegalovirus that allows them to evade the human immune system's CD8 T-cell response by interfering with an infected cell's ability to show viral epitopes to T cells. Its secondary structure shows three helices.

== Method of action ==
It works by inhibiting transfer of viral particles to the human TAP proteins and thus entry of viral peptides into the endoplasmic reticulum, which is supposed to bind them to MHC class I molecules for extracellular T-cell recognition so the viral component will trigger immune defense response as a foreign entity. However human or some animal TAP proteins differs in mice making rodents far less susceptible than humans to HSV.
