= HHV latency associated transcript =

HHV latency associated transcript (HHV LAT) is a length of RNA which accumulates in cells hosting long-term, or latent, human herpes virus (HHV) infections. The LAT RNA is produced by genetic transcription from a certain region of the viral DNA. LAT regulates the viral genome and interferes with the normal activities of the infected host cell.

Herpes virus may establish lifelong infection during which a reservoir virus population survives in host nerve cells for long periods of time. Such long-term Herpes infection requires a mode of cellular infection known as latent infection. During the latent infection, the metabolism of the host cell is disrupted. While the infected cell would ordinarily undergo an organized death or be removed by the immune system, the consequences of LAT production interfere with these normal processes.

Latency is distinguished from lytic infection; in lytic infection many Herpes virus particles are produced and then burst or lyse the host cell. Lytic infection is sometimes known as "productive" infection. Latent cells harbor the virus for long time periods, then occasionally convert to productive infection which may lead to a recurrence of symptomatic Herpes symptoms.

During latency, most of the Herpes DNA is inactive, with the exception of LAT, which accumulates within infected cells. The region of HHV DNA which encodes LAT is known as LAT-DNA. After splicing, LAT is a 2.0-kilobase transcript (or intron) produced from the 8.3-kb LAT-DNA. The DNA region containing LAT-DNA is known as the Latency Associated Transcript Region.

The LAT mainly performs two functions: it suppresses apoptosis so that latently infected host cells stay alive for the reservoir, and suppresses the expression of lytic genes during latent infection.

== Lytic gene regulation ==
HHV Infected Cell Polypeptide 0 (ICP0) gene is expressed very early during lytic infection, and for this reason is called an immediate-early Herpes gene. In 1991, Farrell and colleagues reported that the 2.0-kb LAT intron terminates at the 5′ end with a 750-base antisense RNA complement for the ICP0 gene.

In 2005, Qing-Yin Wang and colleagues from Harvard Medical School concluded, using assays comparing LAT-negative vs. LAT-positive virus strains, that expression of LAT in neurons represses the expression of several lytic gene products, including ICP4 and Thymidine Kinase. LAT expression results in changes to Histones, thus converting portions of viral DNA into a non-productive form known as heterochromatin.

Simian varicella virus (SVV) is a Varicellovirus (a Genus of Subfamily Alphaherpesvirinae) which expresses an HHV LAT homolog known as SVV LAT, and an HHV ICP0 analog known as SVV-ORF61 (Open Reading Frame). SVV LAT is encoded such that it contains an antisense copy of SVV-ORF61 and that expression of SVV LAT during latency downregulates expression of ORF61 and other immediate-early SVV gene products.

=== Chromatin insulator ===
LAT DNA contains an activation boundary between activated LAT-DNA and the inactive lytic viral DNA called a chromatin insulator. CCCTC-binding factor (CTCF) is a zinc finger protein which occurs naturally in some human cells. CTCF is localized to the nucleus of cells. CTCF has been shown to naturally regulate the expression of human linear dsDNA by binding with target DNA sequences or motifs. CTCF binding to DNA may result in formation of transcription-ready euchromatin through the Histone H3-acetylating activity which results due to CTCF binding. Acetylation of Histone promotes transcription of DNA to RNA, and then to protein products.

A March 2006 University of Florida College of Medicine study showed that expression of the Herpes virus genome may be regulated in part by the binding of CTCF to CTCF-binding motifs. The researchers used sequence analysis and quantitative genomics assays on HHV DNA. In the U. Florida study, the LAT region was found to contain a CTCF-binding region within a 1.5k-bp (base pair) region, and found to contain a "chromatin insulator-like element". A May 2007 study conducted at the Wistar Institute localized the LAT CTCF-binding motif to an 800-bp sequence of the LAT intron, and demonstrated that the region insulated activated LAT chromatin from repressed chromatin that would otherwise produce the lytic protein HHV Infected Cell Polypeptide 0 (ICP0).

== Interference of cellular pathways ==
It was alleged that a portion of HSV-1 LAT consists of an interfering micro RNA (miRNA), termed mir-LAT. This miRNA is shown to downregulate Transforming Growth Factor-β1 (TGF-β1) and SMAD3. These effects block apoptosis, or normal programmed cell death. However, although HSV does downregulate apotopsis, the particular miRNA has come to be seen as an experimental artifact, and the paper was consequently retracted.

Other research showed that the products from the first 4,658 nucleotides of LAT inhibited caspase-8 and caspase-9 cellular death factors. Further research has shown that HHV-8 LAT produces RNA which interfere not with expression of TGF-β1 and SMAD3, but reducing the expression of Thrombospondin-1 protein (THBS-1). In turn, down-regulation of THBS-1 reduces production of TGF-β1 and SMAD3, suppressing apoptosis.

== Protein products ==
The exon parts of LAT-DNA produce two protein products with repeats that are 17 amino acids long, termed HHV latency-related proteins or LR-ORF1 and LR-ORF2. Little is known about these two proteins (P17588 and P17589 in HHV-1; K4PBJ5 and Q77CA8 in BHV-1), although the loss of ORF2 in bovine herpesvirus-1 (BHV-1) does appear to interfere with the establishment of latency. ORF2 has been shown to possess DNA-binding properties. It appears responsible for the inhibition of apotopsis.
