= HMG20B =

Protein-coding gene in the species Homo sapiens

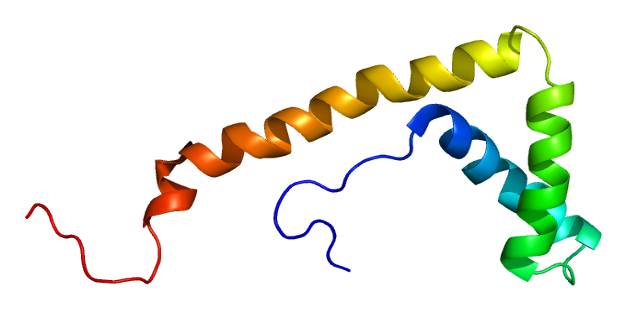

Identifiers
- Aliases: HMG20B, BRAF25, BRAF35, HMGX2, HMGXB2, PP7706, SMARCE1r, SOXL, pp8857, high mobility group 20B
- External IDs: OMIM: 605535; MGI: 1341190; GeneCards: HMG20B
Available structures
PDB	Ortholog search: PDBe RCSB
PDB	List of PDB id codes 2CRJ

Gene location (Human)
Chr.	Chromosome 19 (human)
Band	19p13.3	Start	3,572,777 bp
Band	19p13.3	End	3,579,088 bp

Gene location (Mouse)
Chr.	Chromosome 10 (mouse)
Band	10 C1|10 39.72 cM	Start	81,181,882 bp
Band	10 C1|10 39.72 cM	End	81,186,314 bp
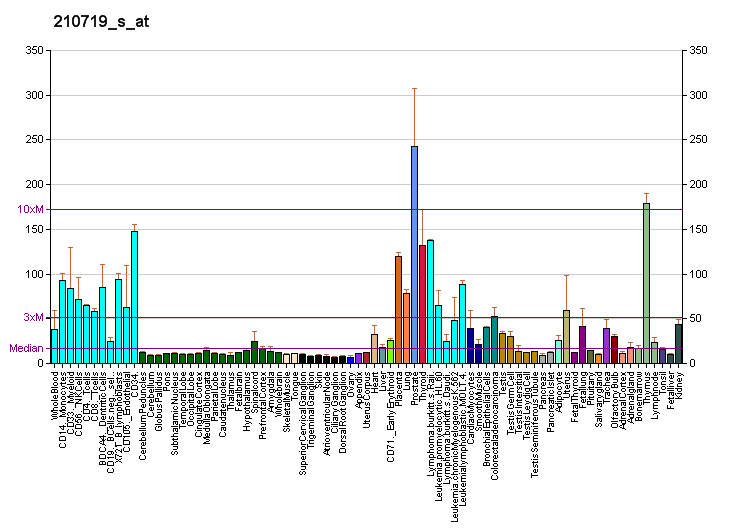

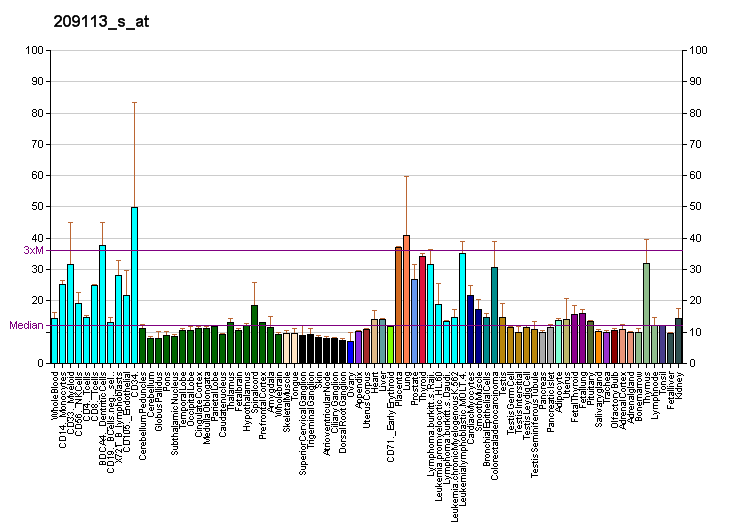
RNA expression pattern
Bgee	Human / Mouse (ortholog); Top expressed in: sural nerve; stromal cell of endometrium; olfactory zone of nasal mucosa; skin of leg; muscle layer of sigmoid colon; canal of the cervix; popliteal artery; tibial arteries; skin of abdomen; right uterine tube / Top expressed in: interventricular septum; lip; yolk sac; genital tubercle; granulocyte; ventricular zone; lens; internal carotid artery; tail of embryo; duodenum; More reference expression data
BioGPS	More reference expression data
Gene ontology
Molecular function	protein heterodimerization activity; DNA binding; protein binding; histone deacetylase activity; DNA-binding transcription factor activity, RNA polymerase II-specific
Cellular component	nucleus; nucleoplasm; chromosome; nuclear body
Biological process	skeletal muscle cell differentiation; cell cycle; negative regulation of protein sumoylation; blood coagulation; regulation of transcription, DNA-templated; positive regulation of neuron differentiation; transcription, DNA-templated; histone deacetylation; chromatin organization; regulation of transcription by RNA polymerase II
Sources:Amigo / QuickGO
Orthologs
Databases	NCBI: entry; OMA: entry
Species	Human	Mouse
Entrez	10362	15353
Ensembl	ENSG00000064961	ENSMUSG00000020232
UniProt	Q9P0W2	Q9Z104
RefSeq (mRNA)	NM_006339	NM_001163165; NM_001163166; NM_010440
RefSeq (protein)	NP_006330	NP_001156637; NP_001156638; NP_034570
Location (UCSC)	Chr 19: 3.57 – 3.58 Mb	Chr 10: 81.18 – 81.19 Mb
PubMed search
- Wikidata
View/Edit Human	View/Edit Mouse

SWI/SNF-related matrix-associated actin-dependent regulator of chromatin subfamily E member 1-related is a protein that in humans is encoded by the HMG20B gene.

HMG20B is a high-mobility group (HMG) DNA binding protein. HMG20B contains a carboxy terminal region that is essential for cytokinesis since it regulates cell cycle progression from the G2 phase into mitosis This carboxy terminal region of HMG20B interacts with the tumor suppressor protein BRCA2. A particular mutation in this region of the HMG20B gene is associated with lung cancer. This mutation interferes with the association of the HMG20B and BRCA2 proteins.

== Interactions ==
HMG20B has been shown to interact with:

- BRCA2,
- HDAC1,
- HDAC2,
- KIF4A,
- PHF21A, and
- RCOR1.
