= Virus latency =

Ability of some viruses to lie dormant within a cell

Virus latency (or viral latency) is the ability of a pathogenic virus to lie dormant (latent) within a cell, denoted as the lysogenic part of the viral life cycle. A latent viral infection is a type of persistent viral infection which is distinguished from a chronic viral infection. Latency is the phase in certain viruses' life cycles in which, after initial infection, proliferation of virus particles ceases. However, the viral genome is not eradicated. The virus can reactivate and begin producing large amounts of viral progeny (the lytic part of the viral life cycle) without the host becoming reinfected by new outside virus, and stays within the host indefinitely.

Virus latency is not to be confused with clinical latency during the incubation period when a virus is not dormant.

== Mechanisms ==
=== Episomal latency ===
Episomal latency refers to the use of genetic episomes—extrachromosomal DNA elements—by a virus during its latent phase. In this latency type, viral genes are stabilized and maintained separately from the host genome, floating within the cell nucleus or cytoplasm as distinct structures. Episomes can be linear or lasso-shaped structures. Compared to proviral latency, episomal latency is more vulnerable to targeted ribozymes—catalytic RNAs designed to cleave specific sequences—and to degradation by host cellular mechanisms, such as nucleases and components of the immune response. Proviral latency, in contrast, involves integration of viral DNA into the host genome, which confers greater stability and resistance to such degradation, ensuring long-term persistence of the viral genome (see below).

==== Herpesviridae ====
Members of the Herpesviridae family of viruses (a.k.a. herpesviruses) all establish latent infection. Among the herpesviruses are varicella zoster virus (VZV), which causes chickenpox and shingles, and herpes simplex viruses 1 and 2 (HSV-1 and HSV-2), all of which establish episomal latency in neurons and leave linear genetic material floating in the cytoplasm.

===== Epstein-Barr virus =====
The Gammaherpesvirinae subfamily is associated with episomal latency established in cells of the immune system, such as B-cells in the case of Epstein–Barr virus (EBV). EBV lytic reactivation (which can be due to chemotherapy, radiation, or other stressors) can result in genome instability and cancer. As of November 2025, epidemiological and immunological evidence increasingly suggests that EBV is an etiologic factor in multiple sclerosis pathogenesis, as well.

===== Herpes simplex virus =====
In the case of herpes simplex, HSVs have been shown to fuse with DNA in neurons, including those in nerve ganglia, and reactivate upon even minor chromatin loosening with stress. However, the chromatin compacts (i.e., becomes latent) upon oxygen and nutrient deprivation.

===== Cytomegalovirus =====
Cytomegalovirus (CMV) establishes latency in myeloid progenitor cells and is reactivated by inflammation. Immunosuppression and critical illness (sepsis, in particular) often results in CMV reactivation. CMV reactivation is commonly seen in patients with severe colitis.

===== Reactivation =====
Reactivation of herpesviruses can occur in response to stress stimuli that affect neurons innervated by the infected ganglion. This can happen locally when neurons are subjected to physical or emotional stress, such as trauma or psychological pressure, or systemically through mechanisms like elevated body temperature during fever or heat exposure, which disrupt viral latency and promote reactivation.

==== Advantages and disadvantages ====
Advantages of episomal latency include the possibility that the virus may not need to enter the cell nucleus, thereby avoiding nuclear domain 10 (ND10) from activating interferon via that pathway. Disadvantages include greater exposure to cellular defenses, potentially leading to degradation of the viral gene by cellular enzymes.

=== Proviral latency ===
A provirus is a viral genome that is integrated into the DNA of a host cell.

==== Advantages and disadvantages ====
Advantages include automatic host cell division, which results in replication of the virus's genes, and the fact that it is nearly impossible to remove an integrated provirus from an infected cell without killing the cell. A disadvantage of this method is the need to enter the nucleus (and the need for packaging proteins that enable it). However, viruses that integrate into the host cell's genome can stay there as long as the cell lives.

==== HIV ====
One of the best-studied viruses that exhibits viral latency is HIV. HIV uses reverse transcriptase to create a DNA copy of its RNA genome. HIV latency allows the virus to largely avoid the immune system. Like other viruses that enter dormancy, HIV does not typically cause symptoms while latent. HIV in proviral latency is nearly impossible to target with antiretroviral drugs. As of September 2021, several classes of latency-reversing agents (LRAs) are under development for possible use in shock-and-kill strategies, in which the latently infected cellular reservoirs would be reactivated (the shock) so that antiviral drug treatment could take effect (the kill).

== Maintaining latency ==
Both proviral and episomal latency may require maintenance for continued infection and fidelity of viral genes. Latency is generally maintained by viral genes expressed primarily during latency. Expression of these latency-associated genes may function to keep the viral genome from being digested by cellular ribozymes or being found out by the immune system. Certain viral gene products (RNA transcripts such as non-coding RNAs and proteins) may also inhibit apoptosis or induce cell growth and division to allow more copies of the infected cell to be produced.

An example of such a gene product is the latency associated transcripts (LATs) in herpes simplex virus, which interfere with apoptosis by downregulating a number of host factors, including major histocompatibility complex (MHC) and inhibiting the apoptotic pathway.

A certain type of latency could be ascribed to the endogenous retroviruses. These viruses have incorporated into the human genome in the distant past, and are now vertically transmitted through reproduction. Generally these types of viruses have become highly evolved, and have lost the expression of many gene products. Some of the proteins expressed by these viruses have co-evolved with host cells to play important roles in normal processes.

== Ramifications ==
While viral latency exhibits no active viral shedding nor causes any pathologies or symptoms, the virus is still able to reactivate via external activators, such as sunlight and stress, to cause an acute infection. In the case of herpes simplex virus, which generally infects an individual for life, a serotype of the virus reactivates occasionally to cause cold sores. Although the sores are quickly resolved by the immune system, they may be a minor annoyance from time to time. In the case of varicella zoster virus, after an initial acute infection (chickenpox) the virus lies dormant until reactivated as herpes zoster.

More serious ramifications of a latent infection could be the possibility of transforming the cell, and forcing the cell into uncontrolled cell division. This is a result of the random insertion of the viral genome into the host's own gene and expression of host cellular growth factors for the benefit of the virus. In a notable event, this actually happened during gene therapy through the use of retroviral vectors at the Necker Hospital in Paris, where twenty young boys received treatment for a genetic disorder, after which five developed leukemia-like syndromes.

=== Human papilloma virus ===
This is also seen with infections of the human papilloma virus in which persistent infection may lead to cervical cancer as a result of cellular transformation.

=== HIV ===
In the field of HIV research, proviral latency in specific long-lived cell types is the basis for the concept of one or more viral reservoirs, referring to locations (cell types or tissues) characterized by persistence of latent virus. Specifically, the presence of replication-competent HIV in resting CD4-positive T cells allows this virus to persist for years without evolving despite prolonged exposure to antiretroviral drugs. This latent reservoir of HIV may explain the inability of antiretroviral treatment to cure HIV infection.

== See also ==
- Slow virus
