= RCOR1 =

Protein-coding gene in the species Homo sapiens

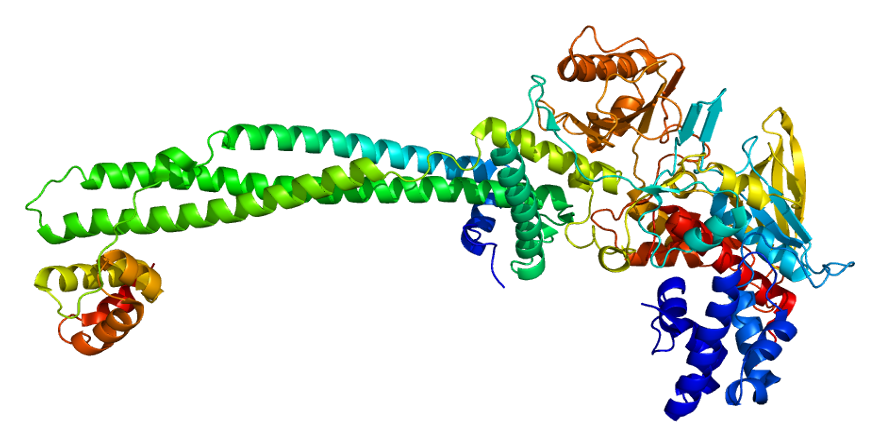

Identifiers
- Aliases: RCOR1, COREST, RCOR, REST corepressor 1
- External IDs: OMIM: 607675; MGI: 106340; GeneCards: RCOR1
Available structures
PDB	Ortholog search: PDBe RCSB
PDB	List of PDB id codes 2IW5, 2UXN, 2UXX, 2V1D, 2X0L, 2XAF, 2XAG, 2XAH, 2XAJ, 2XAQ, 2XAS, 2Y48, 3ZMS, 3ZMT, 3ZMU, 3ZMV, 3ZMZ, 3ZN0, 3ZN1, 4BAY, 4KUM, 4UV8, 4UV9, 4UVA, 4UVB, 4UVC, 4UXN, 5L3D, 5L3B, 5L3C, 4XBF

Gene location (Human)
Chr.	Chromosome 14 (human)
Band	14q32.31-q32.32	Start	102,592,649 bp
Band	14q32.31-q32.32	End	102,730,561 bp

Gene location (Mouse)
Chr.	Chromosome 12 (mouse)
Band	12 F1|12 60.93 cM	Start	111,005,785 bp
Band	12 F1|12 60.93 cM	End	111,082,335 bp
RNA expression pattern
Bgee	Human / Mouse (ortholog); Top expressed in: secondary oocyte; gums; gingival epithelium; bone marrow; mucosa of pharynx; palpebral conjunctiva; bone marrow cell; jejunal mucosa; skin of thigh; human penis / Top expressed in: hair follicle; Gonadal ridge; epithelium of stomach; human fetus; left lung lobe; left colon; atrium; crypt of lieberkuhn of small intestine; Paneth cell; saccule; More reference expression data
BioGPS	n/a
Gene ontology
Molecular function	DNA binding; DNA-binding transcription repressor activity, RNA polymerase II-specific; protein binding; transcription factor binding; histone deacetylase activity; transcription corepressor activity; DNA-binding transcription factor activity, RNA polymerase II-specific; DNA-binding transcription factor activity
Cellular component	DNA repair complex; transcription repressor complex; nucleus; transcription regulator complex; nucleoplasm
Biological process	histone H4 deacetylation; viral process; negative regulation of transcription, DNA-templated; regulation of transcription, DNA-templated; blood coagulation; transcription, DNA-templated; negative regulation of transcription by RNA polymerase II; chromatin organization; regulation of transcription by RNA polymerase II
Sources:Amigo / QuickGO
Orthologs
Databases	NCBI: entry; OMA: entry
Species	Human	Mouse
Entrez	23186	217864
Ensembl	ENSG00000089902	ENSMUSG00000037896
UniProt	Q9UKL0	Q8CFE3
RefSeq (mRNA)	NM_015156	NM_198023
RefSeq (protein)	NP_055971	NP_932140
Location (UCSC)	Chr 14: 102.59 – 102.73 Mb	Chr 12: 111.01 – 111.08 Mb
PubMed search
- Wikidata
View/Edit Human	View/Edit Mouse

REST corepressor 1 also known as CoREST is a protein that in humans is encoded by the RCOR1 gene.

== Function ==
This gene encodes a protein that is well-conserved, downregulated at birth, and with a specific role in determining neural cell differentiation. The encoded protein binds to the C-terminal domain of REST (repressor element-1 silencing transcription factor).

== Interactions ==
RCOR1 has been shown to interact with

- HDAC1,
- HDAC2,
- HMG20B,
- REST and
- PHF21A.
