= RE1-silencing transcription factor =

Protein found in humans

REST

Identifiers
- Aliases: REST, Rest, 2610008J04Rik, AA407358, NRSF, XBR, REST4, WT6, RE1 silencing transcription factor, GINGF5, HGF5, DFNA27
- External IDs: OMIM: 600571; MGI: 104897; GeneCards: REST
Available structures
PDB	Ortholog search: PDBe RCSB
PDB	List of PDB id codes 2CZY

Gene location (Human)
Chr.	Chromosome 4 (human)
Band	4q12	Start	56,907,876 bp
Band	4q12	End	56,966,808 bp

Gene location (Mouse)
Chr.	Chromosome 5 (mouse)
Band	5|5 C3.3	Start	77,413,338 bp
Band	5|5 C3.3	End	77,434,279 bp
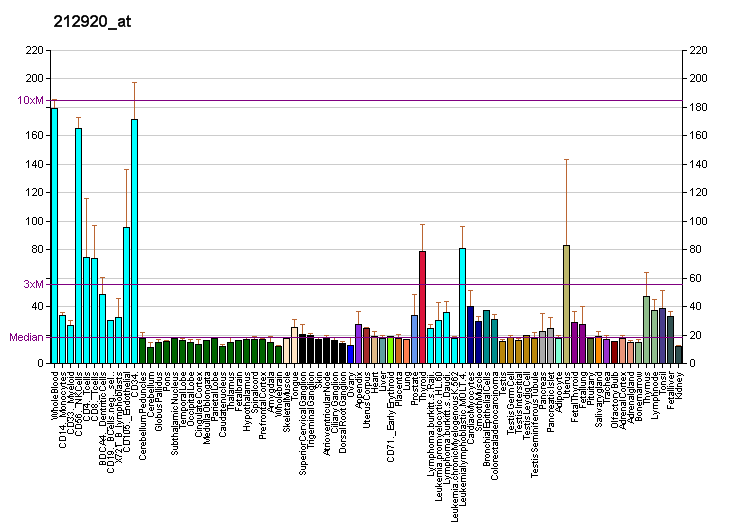

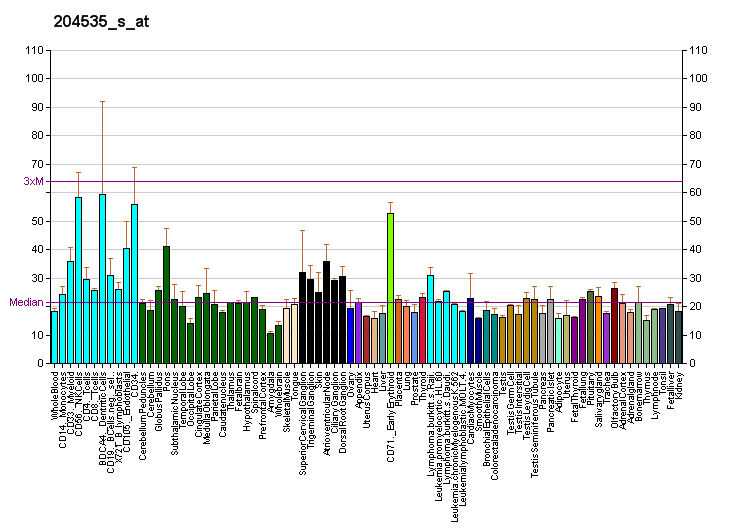
RNA expression pattern
Bgee	Human / Mouse (ortholog); Top expressed in: gonad; mucosa of paranasal sinus; testicle; Achilles tendon; epithelium of nasopharynx; epithelium of colon; Epithelium of choroid plexus; retinal pigment epithelium; bone marrow cell; oral cavity / Top expressed in: external carotid artery; internal carotid artery; zygote; superior surface of tongue; cumulus cell; gallbladder; human fetus; secondary oocyte; primary oocyte; Gonadal ridge; More reference expression data
BioGPS	More reference expression data
Gene ontology
Molecular function	DNA binding; outward rectifier potassium channel activity; DNA-binding transcription activator activity, RNA polymerase II-specific; transcription factor binding; metal ion binding; core promoter sequence-specific DNA binding; protein binding; nucleic acid binding; DNA-binding transcription repressor activity, RNA polymerase II-specific; histone deacetylase activity; chromatin binding; DNA-binding transcription factor activity; DNA-binding transcription factor activity, RNA polymerase II-specific; RNA polymerase II cis-regulatory region sequence-specific DNA binding; RNA polymerase II core promoter sequence-specific DNA binding
Cellular component	cytosol; nucleoplasm; transcription repressor complex; nucleus; cytoplasm; histone methyltransferase complex
Biological process	cellular response to electrical stimulus; negative regulation of dense core granule biogenesis; negative regulation of insulin secretion; negative regulation of cortisol biosynthetic process; negative regulation of transcription by RNA polymerase II; transcription by RNA polymerase II; negative regulation of gene expression; transcription, DNA-templated; negative regulation of amniotic stem cell differentiation; positive regulation of transcription, DNA-templated; negative regulation of mesenchymal stem cell differentiation; histone H4 deacetylation; positive regulation of cysteine-type endopeptidase activity involved in apoptotic process; cellular response to glucocorticoid stimulus; negative regulation of calcium ion-dependent exocytosis; hematopoietic progenitor cell differentiation; positive regulation of transcription by RNA polymerase II; negative regulation of cell population proliferation; negative regulation of aldosterone biosynthetic process; negative regulation of transcription, DNA-templated; cardiac muscle cell myoblast differentiation; negative regulation of neurogenesis; potassium ion transmembrane transport; regulation of transcription, DNA-templated; positive regulation of apoptotic process; negative regulation of neuron differentiation; regulation of transcription by RNA polymerase II; regulation of alternative mRNA splicing, via spliceosome; response to hypoxia; regulation of gene expression; positive regulation of neuron differentiation; regulation of osteoblast differentiation
Sources:Amigo / QuickGO
Orthologs
Databases	NCBI: entry; OMA: entry
Species	Human	Mouse
Entrez	5978	19712
Ensembl	ENSG00000084093	ENSMUSG00000029249
UniProt	Q13127	Q8VIG1
RefSeq (mRNA)	NM_001193508; NM_005612; NM_001363453	NM_011263
RefSeq (protein)	NP_001180437; NP_005603; NP_001350382	NP_035393
Location (UCSC)	Chr 4: 56.91 – 56.97 Mb	Chr 5: 77.41 – 77.43 Mb
PubMed search
- Wikidata
View/Edit Human	View/Edit Mouse

RE1-Silencing Transcription factor (REST), also known as Neuron-Restrictive Silencer Factor (NRSF), is a protein which in humans is encoded by the REST gene, and acts as a transcriptional repressor. REST is expressly involved in the repression of neural genes in non-neuronal cells. Many genetic disorders have been tied to alterations in the REST expression pattern, including colon and small-cell lung carcinomas found with truncated versions of REST. In addition to these cancers, defects in REST have also been attributed a role in Huntington's disease, neuroblastomas, and the effects of epileptic seizures and ischemia.

== Function ==
This gene encodes a transcriptional repressor which represses neuronal genes in non-neuronal tissues. It is a member of the Kruppel-type zinc finger transcription factor family. It represses transcription by binding a DNA sequence element called the neuron-restrictive silencer element (NRSE, also known as RE1). The protein is also found in undifferentiated neuronal progenitor cells, and it is thought that this repressor may act as a master negative regulator of neurogenesis. Alternatively spliced transcript variants have been described; however, their full length nature has not been determined. REST is found to be down-regulated in elderly people with Alzheimer's disease.

REST contains 8 Cys_{2}His_{2} zinc fingers and mediates gene repression by recruiting several chromatin-modifying enzymes.

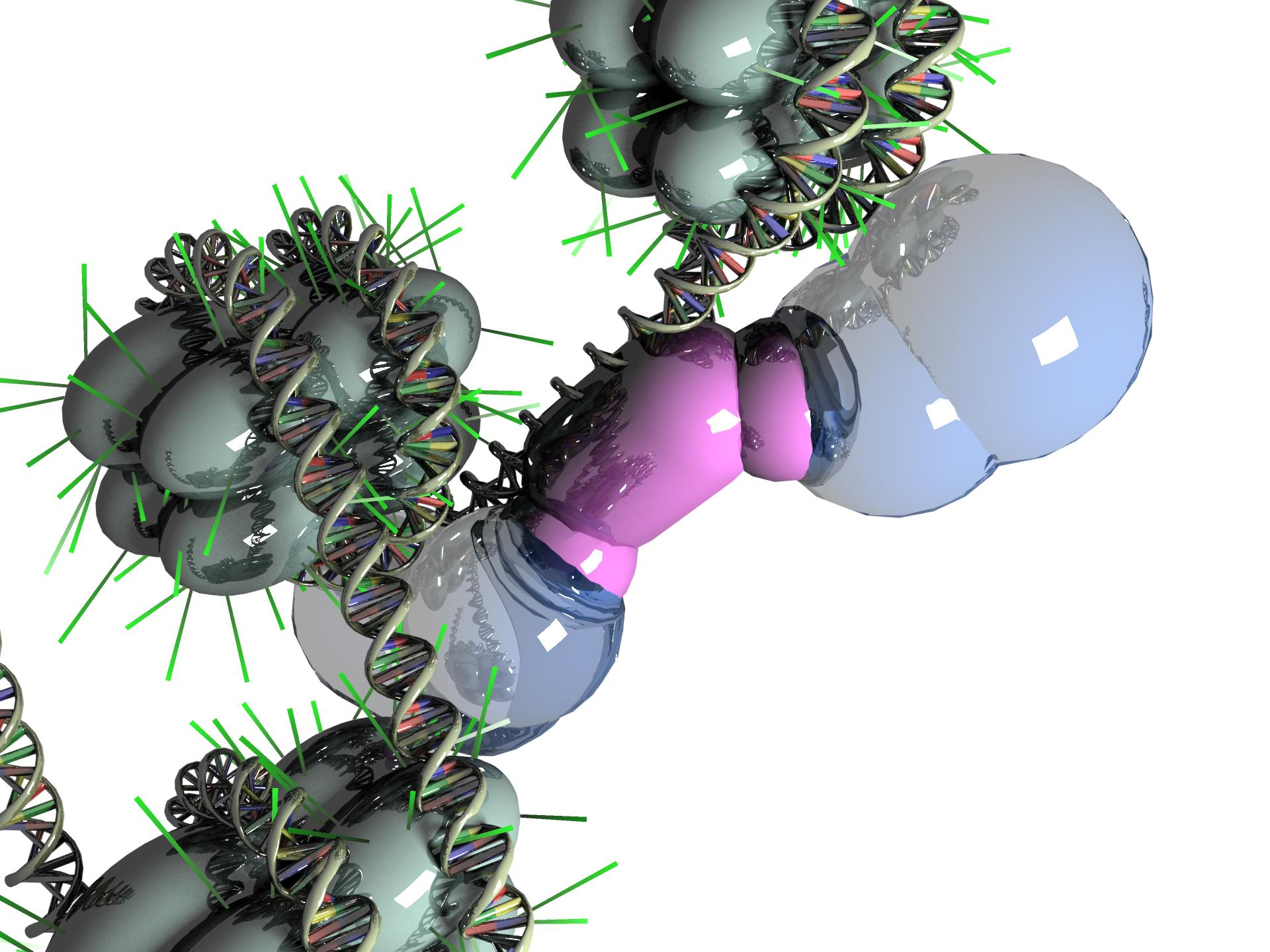
NRSF bound to DNA and cofactors on each of its two cofactor binding domains

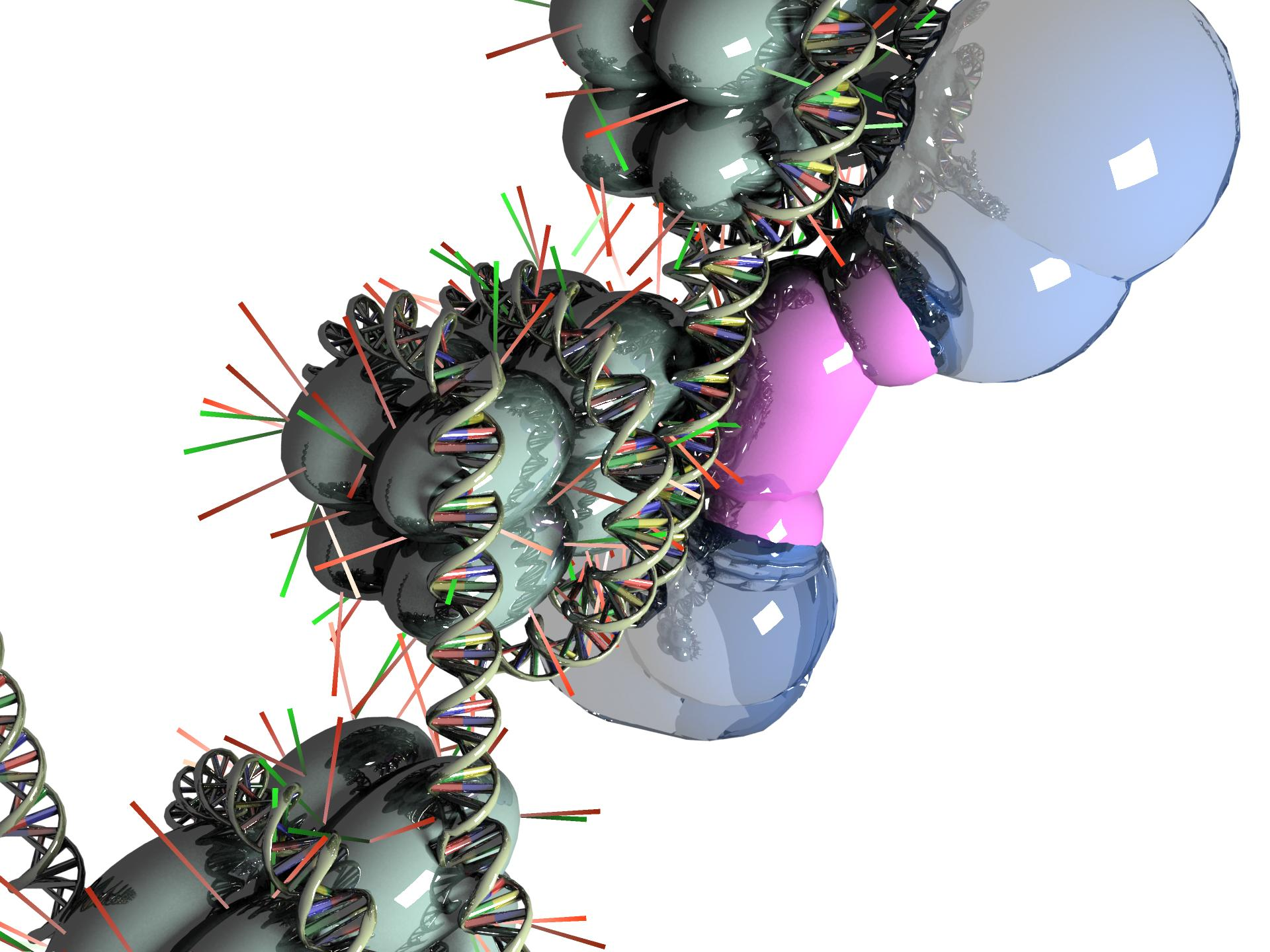
Chromatin remodeling occurs, causing the gene to be 'turned off'

REST is also responsible for ischaemia induced neuronal cell death, in mouse models of brain ischaemia. Ischaemia, which results from reduced blood perfusion of tissues, decreasing nutrient and oxygen supply, induces REST transcription and nuclear accumulation, leading to the epigenetic repression of neuronal genes leading to cell death. The mechanism beyond REST induction in ischaemia, might be tightly linked to its oxygen-dependent nuclear translocation and repression of target genes in hypoxia (low oxygen) where REST fulfils the functions of a master regulator of gene repression in hypoxia.

== Interactions ==
RE1-silencing transcription factor has been shown to interact with RCOR1.
