= PHF12 =

Protein-coding gene in the species Homo sapiens

Identifiers
- Aliases: PHF12, PF1, PHD finger protein 12
- External IDs: MGI: 1924057; GeneCards: PHF12
Available structures
PDB	Ortholog search: PDBe RCSB
PDB	List of PDB id codes 2L9S, 2LKM

Gene location (Human)
Chr.	Chromosome 17 (human)
Band	17q11.2	Start	28,905,250 bp
Band	17q11.2	End	28,951,771 bp

Gene location (Mouse)
Chr.	Chromosome 11 (mouse)
Band	11|11 B5	Start	77,873,580 bp
Band	11|11 B5	End	77,921,365 bp
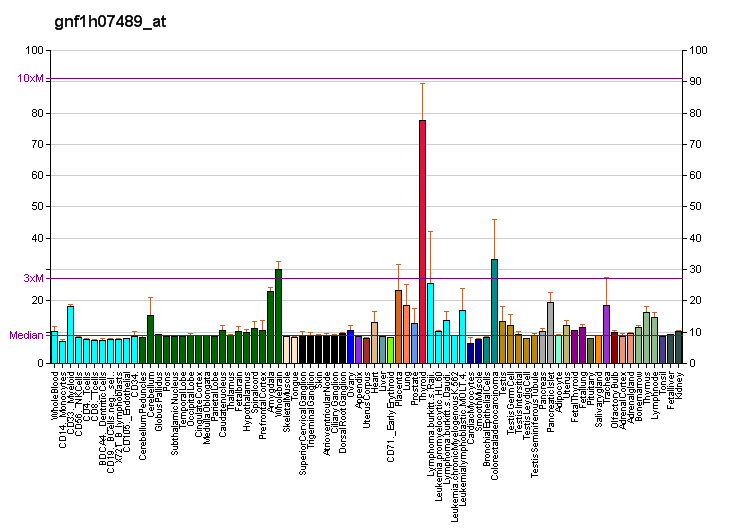
RNA expression pattern
Bgee	Human / Mouse (ortholog); Top expressed in: sural nerve; granulocyte; bone marrow cell; stromal cell of endometrium; spleen; right lung; blood; appendix; gastric mucosa; ganglionic eminence / Top expressed in: genital tubercle; tail of embryo; neural layer of retina; granulocyte; ventricular zone; zygote; superior frontal gyrus; dentate gyrus of hippocampal formation granule cell; thymus; secondary oocyte; More reference expression data
BioGPS	More reference expression data
Gene ontology
Molecular function	transcription corepressor binding; histone binding; transcription corepressor activity; RNA polymerase II transcription regulatory region sequence-specific DNA binding; chromatin binding; protein binding; phosphatidylinositol binding; metal ion binding
Cellular component	transcription repressor complex; Sin3 complex; nucleus; nucleoplasm; Sin3-type complex
Biological process	negative regulation of transcription, DNA-templated; regulation of transcription, DNA-templated; negative regulation of transcription by RNA polymerase II; transcription, DNA-templated
Sources:Amigo / QuickGO
Orthologs
Databases	NCBI: entry; OMA: entry
Species	Human	Mouse
Entrez	57649	268448
Ensembl	ENSG00000109118	ENSMUSG00000037791
UniProt	Q96QT6	Q5SPL2
RefSeq (mRNA)	NM_001033561; NM_001290131; NM_020889	NM_174852
RefSeq (protein)	NP_001028733; NP_001277060; NP_065940	NP_777277
Location (UCSC)	Chr 17: 28.91 – 28.95 Mb	Chr 11: 77.87 – 77.92 Mb
PubMed search
- Wikidata
View/Edit Human	View/Edit Mouse

PHD finger protein 12 is a protein that in humans is encoded by the PHF12 gene.

== Interactions ==
PHF12 has been shown to interact with SIN3A.
