= Martinostat =

Chemical compound

Clinical data
- Drug class: Histone deacetylase inhibitor
- ATC code: None

Identifiers
- IUPAC name: (2E)-3-(4-{[(Adamantan-1-ylmethyl)(methyl)amino]methyl}phenyl)-N-hydroxyacrylamide
- CAS Number: 1629052-58-9
- PubChem CID: 90479372
- DrugBank: DB14979
- ChemSpider: 34987952
- UNII: 8JJC99KHGL
- ChEMBL: ChEMBL5796974
- CompTox Dashboard (EPA): DTXSID101045816

Chemical and physical data
- Formula: C_{22}H_{30}N_{2}O_{2}
- Molar mass: 354.494 g·mol^{−1}
- 3D model (JSmol): Interactive image
- SMILES: CN(CC1=CC=C(C=C1)/C=C/C(=O)NO)CC23CC4CC(C2)CC(C4)C3
- InChI: InChI=1S/C22H30N2O2/c1-24(14-17-4-2-16(3-5-17)6-7-21(25)23-26)15-22-11-18-8-19(12-22)10-20(9-18)13-22/h2-7,18-20,26H,8-15H2,1H3,(H,23,25)/b7-6+; Key:WNIDBXBLQFPAJA-VOTSOKGWSA-N

Martinostat is a histone deacetylase (HDAC) inhibitor which is used in scientific research.

Martinostat activities
Enzyme	IC_{50} (nM)
HDAC1	0.3
HDAC2	0.8–2.0
HDAC3	0.6
HDAC4	1,970
HDAC5	352
HDAC6	4.1
HDAC7	>20,000
HDAC8	>15,000
HDAC9	>15,000
HDAC10	ND
HDAC11	ND
Refs:

It is potent against recombinant class I HDACs (HDAC1, HDAC2, HDAC3) and class IIb HDAC (HDAC6) with low nanomolar affinities. In tissue CETSA assays, martinostat exhibits selectivity for class I HDACs.

Unlike many other HDAC inhibitors, like vorinostat and givinostat, which show poor brain penetrance and only subtle brain HDAC inhibition, martinostat is highly lipophilic due to its adamantyl group and shows robust brain uptake. When tagged with the radioisotope carbon-11, martinostat can be used to quantify HDAC in the brain and peripheral organs using positron emission tomography (PET) imaging.

Martinostat was first described in the scientific literature by 2014. It was given a name that adopted the style of other HDAC inhibitors, such as vorinostat, entinostat, and crebinostat, that recognized the academic center in which it was developed, the Martinos Center for Biomedical Imaging.

^{11}C-labeled martinostat

== See also ==
- Histone deacetylase inhibitor
