= Trichostatin A =

Chemical compound

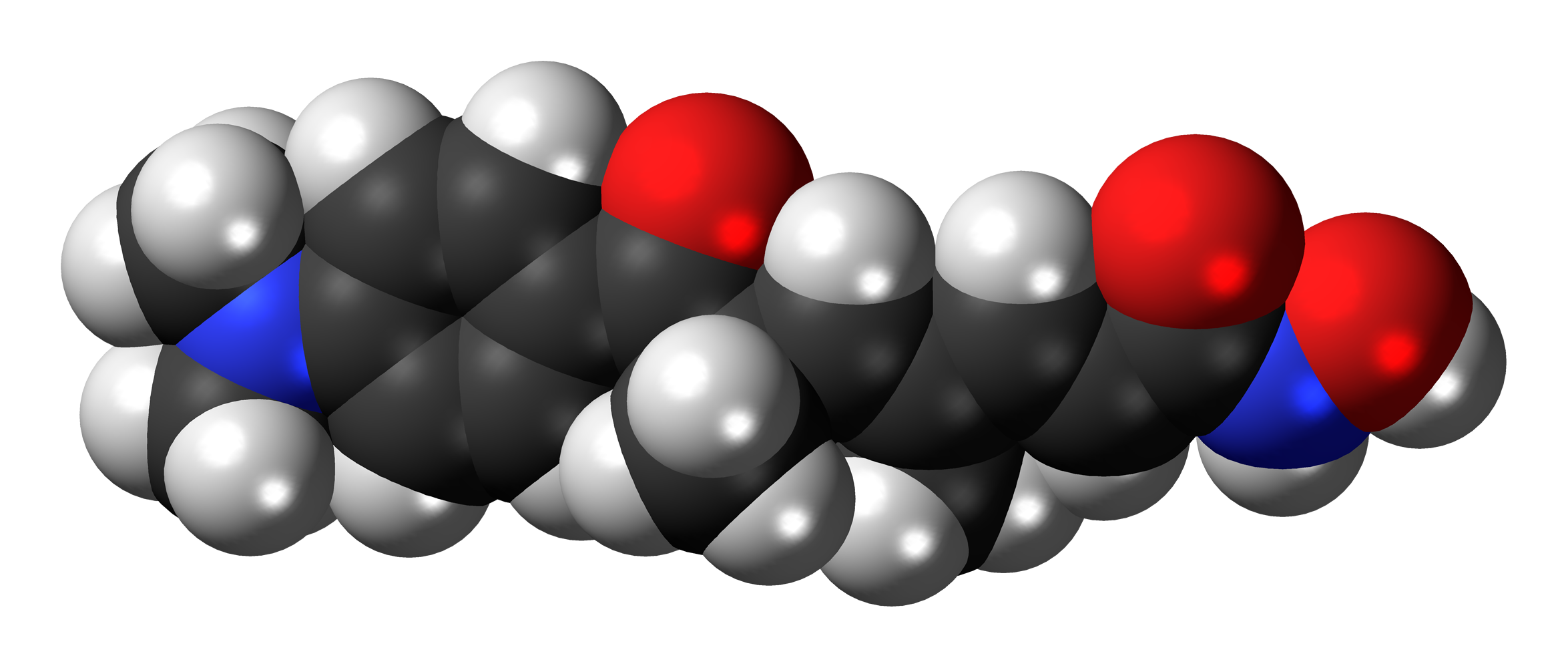

Clinical data
- Other names: TSA
- Pregnancy category: Teratogenic
- Drug class: Histone deacetylase inhibitor
- ATC code: None

Identifiers
- IUPAC name: (2E,4E,6R)-7-[4-(Dimethylamino)phenyl]-N-hydroxy-4,6-dimethyl-7-oxo-2,4-heptadienamide
- CAS Number: 58880-19-6
- PubChem CID: 444732
- IUPHAR/BPS: 7005
- DrugBank: DB04297
- ChemSpider: 392575
- UNII: 3X2S926L3Z
- ChEBI: CHEBI:46024
- ChEMBL: ChEMBL99
- CompTox Dashboard (EPA): DTXSID6037063
- ECHA InfoCard: 100.107.856

Chemical and physical data
- Formula: C_{17}H_{22}N_{2}O_{3}
- Molar mass: 302.374 g·mol^{−1}
- 3D model (JSmol): Interactive image
- SMILES: O=C(NO)\C=C\C(=C\[C@H](C(=O)c1ccc(N(C)C)cc1)C)C
- InChI: InChI=1S/C17H22N2O3/c1-12(5-10-16(20)18-22)11-13(2)17(21)14-6-8-15(9-7-14)19(3)4/h5-11,13,22H,1-4H3,(H,18,20)/b10-5+,12-11+/t13-/m1/s1; Key:RTKIYFITIVXBLE-QEQCGCAPSA-N

Trichostatin A (TSA) is an organic compound that serves as an antifungal antibiotic and selectively inhibits the class I and II mammalian histone deacetylase (HDAC) families of enzymes, but not class III HDACs (i.e., sirtuins). However, there are recent reports of the interactions of this molecule with sirtuin 6 as well.

== Pharmacology ==
=== Pharmacodynamics ===
Trichostatin A activities
Enzyme	IC_{50} (nM)
HDAC1	4.99
HDAC2	2.7
HDAC3	5.21
HDAC4	27.6
HDAC5	776
HDAC6	16.4
HDAC7	482
HDAC8	486
HDAC9	>1,000
HDAC10	24.3
HDAC11	>1,000
Refs:

TSA inhibits the eukaryotic cell cycle during the beginning of the growth stage. TSA can be used to alter gene expression by interfering with the removal of acetyl groups from histones (histone deacetylases, HDAC) and therefore altering the ability of DNA transcription factors to access the DNA molecules inside chromatin. It is a member of a larger class of histone deacetylase inhibitors (HDIs or HDACIs) that have a broad spectrum of epigenetic activities. TSA inhibits HDAC1, HDAC2, HDAC3, HDAC4, HDAC6, and HDAC10 with low-nanomolar IC_{50} values ranging from 2.7 to 27.6 nM.

As an HDAC inhibitor, TSA has some potential as an anti-cancer drug. One suggested mechanism is that TSA promotes the expression of apoptosis-related genes, leading to cancerous cells surviving at lower rates, thus slowing the progression of cancer. Other mechanisms may include the activity of HDIs to induce cell differentiation, thus acting to "mature" some of the de-differentiated cells found in tumors. HDIs have multiple effects on non-histone effector molecules, so the anti-cancer mechanisms are truly not understood at this time.

Injection of TSA directly into the hippocampus has been found to enhance fear extinction in rodents. TSA represses IL (interleukin)-1β/LPS (lipopolysaccharide)/IFNγ (interferon γ)-induced nitric oxide synthase 2 (NOS2) expression in murine macrophage-like cells but increases LPS-stimulated NOS2 expression in murine N9 and primary rat microglial cells.

== Chemistry ==
=== Analogues ===
Vorinostat (SAHA) is structurally related to TSA and used to treat cutaneous T cell lymphoma.

== See also ==
- Histone deacetylase inhibitor
- Vorinostat (SAHA)
