= Ricolinostat =

Clinical data
- Other names: Rocilinostat; ACY-1215; ACY1215; ACY-63; ACY63
- Routes of administration: Oral
- Drug class: Histone deacetylase inhibitor; HDAC6 inhibitor

Identifiers
- IUPAC name: N-[7-(hydroxyamino)-7-oxoheptyl]-2-(N-phenylanilino)pyrimidine-5-carboxamide
- CAS Number: 1316214-52-4
- PubChem CID: 53340666
- DrugBank: DB12376
- ChemSpider: 28536129
- UNII: WKT909C62B
- KEGG: D10661
- ChEBI: CHEBI:95073
- ChEMBL: ChEMBL2364628

Chemical and physical data
- Formula: C_{24}H_{27}N_{5}O_{3}
- Molar mass: 433.512 g·mol^{−1}
- 3D model (JSmol): Interactive image
- SMILES: C1=CC=C(C=C1)N(C2=CC=CC=C2)C3=NC=C(C=N3)C(=O)NCCCCCCC(=O)NO
- InChI: InChI=1S/C24H27N5O3/c30-22(28-32)15-9-1-2-10-16-25-23(31)19-17-26-24(27-18-19)29(20-11-5-3-6-12-20)21-13-7-4-8-14-21/h3-8,11-14,17-18,32H,1-2,9-10,15-16H2,(H,25,31)(H,28,30); Key:QGZYDVAGYRLSKP-UHFFFAOYSA-N

Ricolinostat (INN, USAN; developmental code names ACY-1215 and ACY-63) is a histone deacetylase (HDAC) inhibitor which is under development for the treatment of diabetic neuropathies, multiple myeloma, and lymphoma. It is taken orally.

== Pharmacology ==
Ricolinostat activities
Enzyme	IC_{50} (nM)
HDAC1	58
HDAC2	48
HDAC3	51
HDAC4	7,000
HDAC5	5,000
HDAC6	4.7
HDAC7	1,400
HDAC8	100
HDAC9	>10,000
HDAC10	ND
HDAC11	>10,000
Refs:

Ricolinostat has been reported to have 10- to 21-fold selectivity for HDAC6 over HDAC1, HDAC2, HDAC3, and HDAC8 and greater than 1,000-fold selectivity for HDAC6 over other HDACs. It has been referred to as the first selective HDAC6 inhibitor and as a first-in-class selective HDAC6 inhibitor. However, although described as a highly selective HDAC6 inhibitor, the drug's selectivity for HDAC6 appears to be controversial. Ricolinostat has been found to improve cognition and memory in rodent models of Alzheimer's disease. It has also been found to reverse cognitive impairment induced by cisplatin, also known as chemotherapy cognitive impairment, in rodents. The pharmacokinetics of ricolinostat have been studied in rodents.

== Side effects ==
Side effects of ricolinostat have been reported to include diarrhea, nausea, fatigue, anemia, and hypercalcemia, among others.

== History ==
Ricolinostat was first described in the scientific literature by 2012. It has been developed by Dana-Farber Cancer Institute, Harvard University, 3E-Regenacy Pharmaceuticals (BC Regenacy), Columbia University, and Regenacy Pharmaceuticals. As of February 2025, the drug is in phase 2 clinical trials for diabetic neuropathies and multiple myeloma and is in phase 1/2 trials for lymphoma. It is or was also under development for a variety of other uses, including breast cancer, Charcot-Marie-Tooth disease, chronic lymphocytic leukemia, fallopian tube cancer, malignant melanoma, ovarian cancer, peripheral nervous system diseases, and peritoneal cancer, but no recent development has been reported for these indications.

== See also ==
- Histone deacetylase inhibitor
