= Entinostat =

Clinical data
- Trade names: Jingzhuda
- Other names: MS-275; MS275; SNDX-275; SNDX275
- Routes of administration: Oral
- Drug class: Histone deacetylase inhibitor; HDAC1, HDAC2, and HDAC3 inhibitor; Antineoplastic agent
- ATC code: L01XH05 (WHO)

Pharmacokinetic data
- Elimination half-life: 33–150 hours

Identifiers
- IUPAC name: (pyridin-3-yl)methyl ({4-[(2-aminophenyl)carbamoyl]phenyl}methyl)carbamate
- CAS Number: 209783-80-2
- PubChem CID: 4261
- IUPHAR/BPS: 7007
- DrugBank: DB11841
- ChemSpider: 4111
- UNII: 1ZNY4FKK9H
- KEGG: D09338
- ChEBI: CHEBI:132082
- ChEMBL: ChEMBL27759
- CompTox Dashboard (EPA): DTXSID0041068
- ECHA InfoCard: 100.158.999

Chemical and physical data
- Formula: C_{21}H_{20}N_{4}O_{3}
- Molar mass: 376.416 g·mol^{−1}
- 3D model (JSmol): Interactive image
- SMILES: C1=CC=C(C(=C1)N)NC(=O)C2=CC=C(C=C2)CNC(=O)OCC3=CN=CC=C3
- InChI: InChI=1S/C21H20N4O3/c22-18-5-1-2-6-19(18)25-20(26)17-9-7-15(8-10-17)13-24-21(27)28-14-16-4-3-11-23-12-16/h1-12H,13-14,22H2,(H,24,27)(H,25,26); Key:INVTYAOGFAGBOE-UHFFFAOYSA-N

Entinostat (INN, USAN, JAN), sold under the brand name Jingzhuda and also known by its developmental code names SNDX-275 and MS-275, is a histone deacetylase (HDAC) inhibitor which is used in the treatment of HER2-negative breast cancer. It is also under development for the treatment of HER2-positive breast cancer and was previously under development for a large number of other cancers. The drug is taken orally.

== Medical uses ==
Entinostat is approved for the treatment of HER2-negative breast cancer in China.

== Side effects ==
Side effects of entinostat include fatigue, nausea, vomiting, anorexia, diarrhea, anemia, thrombocytopenia, neutropenia, leukopenia, hypoalbuminemia, hypophosphatemia, hyperglycemia, and hyponatremia, among others.

== Pharmacology ==
=== Pharmacodynamics ===
Entinostat activities
Enzyme	IC_{50} (nM)
HDAC1	243–427
HDAC2	306–753
HDAC3	248–1,577
HDAC4	>100,000
HDAC5	>30,000
HDAC6	>100,000
HDAC7	>30,000
HDAC8	2,700–82,500
HDAC9	>30,000
HDAC10	94,700
HDAC11	>10,000
Refs:

Entinostat is a benzamide histone deacetylase inhibitor. It is a selective inhibitor of the class I HDACs, including HDAC1, HDAC2, and HDAC3, with IC_{50} values of 243 to 453 nM and high selectivity over other HDACs. However, it has also been reported to inhibit the class IV HDAC11, though findings are mixed.

=== Pharmacokinetics ===
Entinostat shows poor penetration into the brain in non-human primates. The elimination half-life of entinostat is 33 to 150 hours in humans.

== History ==
Entinostat was first described in the scientific literature, under the developmental code name MS-275, in 1999.

Syndax Pharmaceuticals held the rights to entinostat and received $26.6 million in funds to advance treatments of resistant cancers using epigenetic tools in 2016.

== Research ==
Entinostat has been studied as a potential reversible male contraceptive.

== See also ==
- Histone deacetylase inhibitor
