= Givinostat =

Chemical compound

Clinical data
- Trade names: Duvyzat
- Other names: ITF-2357; ITF2357
- AHFS/Drugs.com: Monograph
- MedlinePlus: a624025
- License data: US DailyMed: Givinostat
- Routes of administration: Oral (suspension)
- Drug class: Histone deacetylase inhibitor
- ATC code: M09AX14 (WHO)

Legal status
- Legal status: US: ℞-only; EU: Rx-only

Pharmacokinetic data
- Bioavailability: Unknown
- Protein binding: 96%
- Metabolism: Extensive (not CYP450 or UGT)
- Onset of action: 2–3 hours (T_{max})
- Elimination half-life: ~6 hours
- Excretion: Urine: <3% unchanged

Identifiers
- IUPAC name: {6-[(diethylamino)methyl]naphthalen-2-yl}methyl [4-(hydroxycarbamoyl)phenyl]carbamate
- CAS Number: 497833-27-9
- PubChem CID: 9804992
- IUPHAR/BPS: 7490
- DrugBank: DB12645
- ChemSpider: 7980752
- UNII: 5P60F84FBH
- KEGG: D12742
- ChEBI: CHEBI:94187
- ChEMBL: ChEMBL1213492
- PDB ligand: QCM (PDBe, RCSB PDB)
- CompTox Dashboard (EPA): DTXSID70198049
- ECHA InfoCard: 100.258.524

Chemical and physical data
- Formula: C_{24}H_{27}N_{3}O_{4}
- Molar mass: 421.497 g·mol^{−1}
- 3D model (JSmol): Interactive image
- SMILES: O=C(OCc2cc1ccc(cc1cc2)CN(CC)CC)Nc3ccc(cc3)C(=O)NO
- InChI: InChI=1S/C24H27N3O4/c1-3-27(4-2)15-17-5-7-21-14-18(6-8-20(21)13-17)16-31-24(29)25-22-11-9-19(10-12-22)23(28)26-30/h5-14,30H,3-4,15-16H2,1-2H3,(H,25,29)(H,26,28); Key:YALNUENQHAQXEA-UHFFFAOYSA-N

Givinostat, sold under the brand name Duvyzat is a medication used for the treatment of Duchenne muscular dystrophy. It is a histone deacetylase inhibitor with potential anti-inflammatory, anti-angiogenic, and antineoplastic activities. It works by targeting pathogenic processes to reduce inflammation and loss of muscle.

The most common side effects include diarrhea, abdominal pain, low platelets (thrombocytopenia), nausea and vomiting, an increase in triglycerides (a type of fat in the body) (hypertriglyceridemia), and fever.

Givinostat was approved for medical use in the United States in March 2024. Givinostat is the first nonsteroidal medication approved by the US Food and Drug Administration (FDA) to treat people with all genetic variants of Duchenne muscular dystrophy. The FDA considers it to be a first-in-class medication.

== Medical uses ==
Givinostat is indicated for the treatment of Duchenne muscular dystrophy (DMD) in people six years of age and older.

=== Available forms ===
Givinostat is available in the form of an oral suspension.

== Adverse effects ==
In clinical trials of givinostat as a salvage therapy for advanced Hodgkin's lymphoma, the most common adverse reactions were fatigue (seen in 50% of participants), mild diarrhea or abdominal pain (40% of participants), moderate thrombocytopenia (decreased platelet counts, seen in one third of patients), and mild leukopenia (a decrease in white blood cell levels, seen in 30% of patients). One-fifth of patients experienced prolongation of the QT interval, a measure of electrical conduction in the heart, severe enough to warrant temporary suspension of treatment.

== Pharmacology ==
=== Mechanism of action ===
Givinostat activities
| Enzyme | IC_{50} (nM) |
|---|---|
| HDAC1 | 133–198 |
| HDAC2 | 293–325 |
| HDAC3 | 136–157 |
| HDAC4 | 1,059 |
| HDAC5 | 532 |
| HDAC6 | 312–315 |
| HDAC7 | 524 |
| HDAC8 | 837–854 |
| HDAC9 | 512–541 |
| HDAC10 | 331–340 |
| HDAC11 | 287–292 |
Refs:

Givinostat is a potent pan-histone deacetylase (HDAC) inhibitor. It non-selectively inhibits all 11 of the HDAC enzymes, with several-fold variation in inhibitory potency across them. The drug inhibits several pro-inflammatory cytokines, including reducing expression of tumour necrosis factor (TNF), interleukin-1α (IL-1α) and 1β (IL-1β), and interleukin-6 (IL-6) in preclinical research and in humans.

It also has activity against cells expressing JAK2(V617F), a mutated form of the janus kinase 2 (JAK2) enzyme that is implicated in the pathophysiology of many myeloproliferative diseases, including polycythaemia vera. In patients with polycythemia, the reduction of mutant JAK2 concentrations by givinostat is believed to slow down the abnormal growth of erythrocytes and ameliorate the symptoms of the disease.

=== Pharmacokinetics ===
The bioavailability of givinostat is unknown. The time to peak levels of givinostat is 2 to 3 hours taken orally. Givinostat efficiently crosses into the brain in rodents. It is described as unique in this regard, as many other histone deacetylase inhibitors poorly penetrate into the brain. However, in another study, givinostat was reported to have poor brain penetrance and only subtle brain HDAC inhibition in rodents. The plasma protein binding of givinostat is 96%. It is extensively metabolism, but cytochrome P450 (CYP450) and glucuronosyltransferase (UGTs) enzymes are not majorly involved. The elimination half-life of givinostat is approximately 6 hours. It is mainly eliminated via metabolism and is excreted in urine less than 3% unchanged.

== History ==
Givinostat was discovered at Italfarmaco of Milan, Italy. It was patented in 1997 and first described in the scientific literature in 2005.

The efficacy of givinostat for the treatment of Duchenne muscular dystrophy was evaluated in a randomized, double-blind, placebo-controlled 18-month phase III study. The primary endpoint was the change from baseline to month 18 using a four stair climb to measure muscle function. All participants continued to receive a standard of care steroid regimen throughout the study and, after 18 months of treatment, participants treated with givinostat showed statistically significant less decline in the time it took to climb four stairs compared to placebo. The mean change from baseline to month 18 in time to climb four stairs was 1.25 seconds for participants receiving givinostat compared to 3.03 seconds for participants receiving placebo. A secondary efficacy endpoint was the change from baseline to month 18 in physical function as assessed by the North Star Ambulatory Assessment (NSAA)—a scale commonly used to rate the motor function in boys with Duchenne muscular dystrophy who are capable of walking. Compared to placebo, participants treated with givinostat saw less worsening in their NSAA score after 18 months. The US Food and Drug Administration (FDA) granted the application for givinostat priority review, fast track, orphan drug, and rare pediatric disease designations. The FDA granted the approval of Duvyzat to Italfarmaco S.p.A. The FDA approved givinostat based on evidence from a single clinical trial (NCT02851797) of 179 males with Duchenne muscular dystrophy who were six years of age and older who could walk and were on stable background therapy with steroids. The trial was conducted at 45 sites in 11 countries in North America and Europe. Twenty-eight of the participants were from the United States.

== Society and culture ==
=== Legal status ===
In April 2025, the Committee for Medicinal Products for Human Use of the European Medicines Agency adopted a positive opinion, recommending the granting of a conditional marketing authorization for the medicinal product Duvyzat, intended for the treatment of Duchenne muscular dystrophy (DMD). The applicant for this medicinal product is Italfarmaco S.p.A. The CHMP's opinion is based on data from a subgroup of 120 participants (79 treated with givinostat and 41 with placebo) in a randomized, placebo-controlled study in ambulant participants with Duchenne muscular dystrophy aged six years of age or older on concomitant steroid treatment. The safety profile of Duvyzat is based on data from 179 participants. The most common events in participants treated with givinostat were diarrhoea, abdominal pain, thrombocytopenia (low levels of blood platelets), vomiting, hypertriglyceridaemia (high blood levels of triglycerides, a type of fat) and fever. Givinostat was authorized for medical use in the European Union in June 2025.

=== Names ===
Givinostat is the generic name of the drug and its International Nonproprietary Name (INN).

== Research ==
In addition to being approved for Duchenne muscular dystrophy (DMD), givinostat is under development for the treatment of polycythemia vera and myeloproliferative disorders. As of June 2026, it is in phase 3 clinical trials for polycythemia vera and phase 2 trials for myeloproliferative disorders. The drug was also previously under development for a wide variety of other cancers and inflammatory diseases, including chronic lymphocytic leukemia, Crohn's disease, diffuse large B cell lymphoma (DLBCL), hereditary autoinflammatory diseases, Hodgkin's disease (Hodgkin lymphoma), juvenile rheumatoid arthritis, and multiple myeloma, but development for these uses was discontinued.
