= Histone deacetylase inhibitor =

Compounds that inhibit histone deacetylases

- Drug class
- Vorinostat (SAHA; Zolinza), the first-approved and most-widely-known HDAC inhibitor.

Class identifiers
- Synonyms: HDAC inhibitor; HDACi; HDI
- Mechanism of action: Histone deacetylase inhibition
- Biological target: Histone deacetylases (HDACs)
- Chemical class: Various

Legal status

Histone deacetylase inhibitors (HDAC inhibitors, HDACi, HDIs) are chemical compounds that inhibit histone deacetylases. Since deacetylation of histones produces transcriptionally silenced heterochromatin, HDIs can render chromatin more transcriptionally active and induce epigenomic changes.

HDIs have a long history of use in psychiatry and neurology as mood stabilizers and anti-epileptics, such as valproic acid. Since at least 2003 they have been investigated as possible treatments for cancers, parasitic and inflammatory diseases.

== Cellular biochemistry/pharmacology ==
To carry out gene expression, a cell must control the coiling and uncoiling of DNA around histones. This is accomplished with the assistance of histone acetyl transferases (HAT), which acetylate the lysine residues in core histones leading to a less compact and more transcriptionally active euchromatin, and, on the converse, the actions of histone deacetylases (HDAC), which remove the acetyl groups from the lysine residues leading to the formation of a condensed and transcriptionally silenced chromatin. Reversible modification of the terminal tails of core histones constitutes the major epigenetic mechanism for remodeling higher-order chromatin structure and controlling gene expression. HDAC inhibitors (HDI) block this action and can result in hyperacetylation of histones, thereby affecting gene expression. The open chromatin resulting from inhibition of histone deacetylases can result in either the up-regulation or the repression of genes.

As of 2015, the histone deacetylase inhibitors were a "new" class of cytostatic agents that inhibit the proliferation of tumor cells in culture and in vivo by inducing cell cycle arrest, differentiation and/or apoptosis. Histone deacetylase inhibitors exert their anti-tumour effects via the induction of expression changes of oncogenes or tumour suppressors through modulating the acetylation/deacetylation of histones and/or non-histone proteins such as transcription factors. Histone acetylation and deacetylation play important roles in the modulation of chromatin topology and the regulation of gene transcription. Histone deacetylase inhibition induces the accumulation of hyperacetylated nucleosome core histones in most regions of chromatin but affects the expression of only a small subset of genes, leading to transcriptional activation of some genes, but repression of an equal or larger number of other genes. Non-histone proteins such as transcription factors are also targets for acetylation with varying functional effects. Acetylation enhances the activity of some transcription factors such as the tumor suppressor p53 and the erythroid differentiation factor GATA1 but may repress transcriptional activity of others including T cell factor and the co-activator ACTR. Recent studies [...] have shown that the estrogen receptor alpha (ERalpha) can be hyperacetylated in response to histone deacetylase inhibition, suppressing ligand sensitivity and regulating transcriptional activation by histone deacetylase inhibitors. Conservation of the acetylated ER-alpha motif in other nuclear receptors suggests that acetylation may play an important regulatory role in diverse nuclear receptor signaling functions. A number of structurally diverse histone deacetylase inhibitors have shown potent antitumor efficacy with little toxicity in vivo in animal models. Several compounds are currently in early phase clinical development as potential treatments for solid and hematological cancers both as monotherapy and in combination with cytotoxics and differentiation agents."

=== HDAC classification ===
Based on their homology of accessory domains to yeast histone deacetylases, the 18 known human histone deacetylases as of 2015 were classified into four groups (I-IV):

- Class I, which includes HDAC1, -2, -3 and -8 are related to yeast RPD3 gene;
- Class IIA, which includes HDAC4, -5, -7 and -9; Class IIB -6, and -10 are related to yeast Hda1 gene;
- Class III, also known as the sirtuins are related to the Sir2 gene and include SIRT1-7
- Class IV, which contains only HDAC11 has features of both Class I and II.

=== HDI classification ===
The "classical" HDIs act exclusively on Class I, II and Class IV HDACs by binding to the zinc-containing catalytic domain of the HDACs. These classical HDIs can be classified into several groupings named according to the chemical moiety that binds to the zinc ion (except cyclic tetrapeptides which bind to the zinc ion with a thiol group). As of 2025, some examples in decreasing order of the typical zinc binding affinity were:

1. hydroxamic acids (or hydroxamates), such as trichostatin A. As of 2025, "second-generation" HDIs includes the hydroxamic acids : vorinostat (SAHA), belinostat (PXD101), resminostat, abexinostat, givinostat, LAQ824, ivaltinostat, nanatinostat and panobinostat (LBH589), tinostamustine, domatinostat, fimepinostat/(CUDC-907), CUDC-101.

2. cyclic tetrapeptides (such as trapoxin B), and the depsipeptides such as: romidepsin, bocodepsin hydrochloride.

3. benzamides : entinostat (MS-275), tacedinaline (CI994), zabadinostat, and mocetinostat (MGCD0103).

4. electrophilic ketones, and the aliphatic acid compounds such as sodium phenylbutyrate and valproic acid.

The sirtuin/Class III HDACs are dependent on NAD+ and are, therefore, inhibited by nicotinamide, as well as derivatives of NAD, dihydrocoumarin, naphthopyranone, and 2-hydroxynaphthaldehydes.

γ-Aminobutyric acid (GABA) might also act as an HDAC inhibitor similarly to structurally related compounds like butyrate (butyric acid), β-hydroxybutyrate (BHB), and valproic acid (valproate), though findings are mixed.

Comparison of inhibitory potencies (IC_{50}, μM) of selected HDAC inhibitors
Drug	HDAC1	HDAC2	HDAC3	HDAC4	HDAC5	HDAC6	HDAC7	HDAC8	HDAC9	HDAC10	HDAC11	Refs
Butyric acid (butyrate)	8.3	7.0	4.8	5,725	6,403	5,881	4,380	10.4	5,614	ND	ND	
Phenylbutyric acid (PBA)	64	65	260	>2,000	>2,000	240	>2,000	93	>2,000	ND	ND	
β-Hydroxybutyric acid (BHB)^{a}	5,300	ND	2,400	4,500	ND	48,500	ND	ND	ND	ND	ND	
Valproic acid (valproate)	3.94–35.5	59.3	218.5	>15,000	>15,000	>20,000	>15,000	1.59–97.1	>15,000	ND	ND	
Vorinostat (SAHA)	0.002	0.003	0.006	>25	19.3	0.004	>25	0.7	>25	0.060	0.031	
Entinostat (MS-275)	0.243	0.453	0.248	>100	>10	>100	>10	82.5	>10	94.7	>10	
Givinostat (ITF-2357)	0.133	0.293	0.136	1.059	0.532	0.312	0.524	0.837	0.512	0.331	0.287	
Martinostat	0.0003	0.0008	0.0006	1.97	0.352	0.0041	>20	>15	>15	ND	ND	
Ricolinostat (ACY-1215)	0.058	0.048	0.051	7	5	0.0047	1.4	0.10	>10	ND	>10	
Trichostatin A (TSA)	0.00499	0.0027	0.00521	0.0276	0.776	0.0164	0.482	0.486	>1	0.0243	>1	
Tacedinaline (CI-994)	0.617	0.593	0.472	>10	>10	>10	>10	>10	>10	>10	>10	
Crebinostat	0.0007	0.0010	0.0020	>2	>2	0.0093	>2	>2	>2	ND	ND	
BRD-6929 (Cpd-60)	0.001	0.008	0.458	>10	>10	>10	>10	>10	>10	3.4	ND	
RGFP136	5.2	3.0	0.4	>180	>180	>180	>180	13.2	ND	ND	ND	
RGFP966	>15	>15	0.08	>15	>15	>15	>15	>15	>15	ND	ND	
Tianeptinaline	0.240	0.120	0.155	ND	>80	>80	ND	ND	ND	ND	ND	
Footnotes: ^{a} = β-Hydroxybutyric acid (BHB) circulates endogenously at millimolar levels during fasting, exercise, ketosis, and diabetic ketoacidosis.

=== Additional functions ===
HDIs should not be considered to act solely as enzyme inhibitors of HDACs. A large variety of nonhistone transcription factors and transcriptional co-regulators are known to be modified by acetylation. HDIs can alter the degree of acetylation nonhistone effector molecules and, therefore, increase or repress the transcription of genes by this mechanism. Examples include: ACTR, cMyb, E2F1, EKLF, FEN 1, GATA, HNF-4, HSP90, Ku70, MKP-1, NF-κB, PCNA, p53, RB, Runx, SF1 Sp3, STAT, TFIIE, TCF, YY1, etc.

== Uses ==
=== Psychiatry and neurology ===
HDIs have a long history of use in psychiatry and neurology as mood stabilizers and anti-epileptics. The prime example of this is valproic acid, marketed as a drug under the trade names Depakene, Depakote, and Divalproex. As of 2008, HDIs were being studied as a mitigator for neurodegenerative diseases such as Alzheimer's disease and Huntington's disease. Enhancement of memory formation was increased in mice given vorinostat, or by genetic knockout of the HDAC2 gene in mice. While that may have relevance to Alzheimer's disease, it was shown that some cognitive deficits were restored in actual transgenic mice with a model of Alzheimer's disease (3xTg-AD) by orally administered nicotinamide, a competitive HDI of Class III sirtuins.

==== Preclinical research for the treatment of depression ====
2012 research into the causes of depression highlighted some possible gene-environment interactions that could explain why after much research, no specific genes or loci have emerged which would indicate risk for depression 2016 studies estimate that even after successive treatments with multiple antidepressants, almost 35% of patients did not achieve remission, suggesting that there could be an epigenetic component to depression which is not addressed by pharmacological treatments. Environmental stressors, namely traumatic stress in childhood such as maternal deprivation and early childhood abuse have been studied for their connection to a high risk of depression in adulthood. In animal models, these types of trauma have been shown to have significant effects on histone acetylation, particularly at gene loci which have known connection to behavior and mood regulation. 2011 research focused on the use of HDI therapy for depression after studies on depressed patients in the middle of a depressive episode found increased expression of HDAC2 and HDAC5 mRNA compared to controls and patients in remission.

===== Effects on gene expression =====
As of 2011 various HDIs have been studied for their connection to the regulation of mood and behavior, each having different, specific effects on the regulation of various genes. The most commonly studied genes include Brain-derived neurotrophic factor (BDNF) and Glial cell line-derived neurotrophic factor (GDNF) both of which help regulate neuron growth and health, whose down regulation can be a symptom of depression. Multiple studies have shown that treatment with an HDI helps to upregulate expression of BDNF: valproic acid commonly used to treat epilepsy and bipolar disorder as well as sodium butyrate both increased expression of BDNF in animal models of depression. One study which traced GDNF levels in the ventral striatum found increased gene expression upon treatment with SAHA.

===== Effects on depressive behaviors =====
Pre-clinical research on the use of HDIs to treat depression use rodents to model human depression. The tail suspension test (TST) and the forced swimming test (FST) measure the level of defeat in rodents— usually after treatment with chronic stress— which mirrors symptoms of human depression. Alongside tests for levels of HDAC mRNA, acetylation and gene expression these behavioral tests are compared to controls to determine whether or not treatment has been successful in ameliorating symptoms of depression. Studies which used SAHA or Entinostat(MS-275) found treated animals displayed gene expression profiles similar to those treated with fluoxetine, and displayed similar anti-depressant like behavior. Sodium butyrate is commonly used as a candidate for mood disorder treatment: studies using it both alone and in co-treatment with fluoxetine report subjects with increased performance on both TST and FST in addition to increased expression of BDNF.

==== Fear-extinction enhancement ====
HDAC inhibitors are of interest for enhancing fear extinction during exposure therapy, for instance to treat anxiety disorders, phobias, and post-traumatic stress disorder (PTSD).

=== Cancer treatment ===
Pan-HDAC inhibitors have shown anticancer potential in several in in vitro and in vivo studies, focused on Pancreatic, Esophageal squamous cell carcinoma (ESCC), Multiple myeloma, Prostate carcinoma, Gastric cancer, Leukemia, breast, Liver cancer, ovarian cancer (belinostat), non-Hodgkin lymphoma and Neuroblastoma. Because of the massive effect of pan-HDAC inhibition, witnessed by the very low dosage concentration used and by the countless biological functions affected, many scientists have focused their attention on combining the less specific HDACi treatment with other more specific anti-cancer drugs, such as the efficacy of the combination treatment with the pan-HDAC inhibitor LBH589 (panobinostat) and the BET bromodomain JQ1 compound.

=== Inflammatory diseases ===
Trichostatin A (TSA) and others are being investigated as anti-inflammatory agents.

=== HIV/AIDS ===
One study noted the use of panobinostat, entinostat, romidepsin, and vorinostat specifically for the purpose of reactivating latent HIV in order to diminish the reservoirs. Vorinostat was noted as the least potent of the HDAC inhibitors in this trial. Another study found that romidepsin led to a higher and more sustained level of cell-associated HIV RNA reactivation than vorinostat in latently infected T-cells in vitro and ex vivo.

=== Other diseases ===
Givinostat (ITF2357) is an orphan drug for treatment of polycythemia vera (PV), essential thrombocythemia (ET) and myelofibrosis (MF). Under the brand name Duvyzat "Givinostat" is used for the treatment of Duchenne muscular dystrophy.

== Myocardial Infarction ==
As of 2008, HDIs were also being studied as protection of heart muscle in acute myocardial infarction.
