= Zabadinostat =

Names
- Preferred IUPAC name N-(2-aminophenyl)-4-[1-[(1,3-dimethyl-1H-pyrazol-4-yl)methyl]-4-piperidinyl]-benzamide
- Other names CXD101, AZD-9468

Identifiers
CAS Number	934828-12-3
3D model (JSmol)	Interactive image
ChEMBL	ChEMBL4297489
ChemSpider	17352606
DrugBank	DB16182
PubChem CID	16225380
UNII	5TNV87ICD2
- InChI: InChI=1S/C24H29N5O/c1-17-21(15-28(2)27-17)16-29-13-11-19(12-14-29)18-7-9-20(10-8-18)24(30)26-23-6-4-3-5-22(23)25/h3-10,15,19H,11-14,16,25H2,1-2H3,(H,26,30) Key: JHDZMASHNBKTPS-UHFFFAOYSA-N
- SMILES: CC1=NN(C=C1CN2CCC(CC2)C3=CC=C(C=C3)C(=O)NC4=CC=CC=C4N)C

Properties
Chemical formula	C_{24}H_{29}N_{5}O
Molar mass	403.530 g·mol^{−1}
- Except where otherwise noted, data are given for materials in their standard state (at 25 °C [77 °F], 100 kPa). Infobox references

Zabadinostat is an experimental epigenetic drug being investigated as a potential treatment for advanced or metastatic cancers. It is an orally available Class I selective histone deacetylase (HDAC) inhibitor, with half maximal inhibitory concentrations (IC_{50}) of 62 nM, 570 nM and 550 nM, against HDAC1, HDAC2 and HDAC3, respectively. It shows no activity against HDAC class II.

== Chemistry ==
The ortho-aminoanilide or benzamide group on zabadinostat sequesters the Zn^{2+} ion required for the hydrolysis and removal of the acetyl group from lysine residues, preventing substrate deacetylation. As such, zabadinostat is chemically distinct from earlier generations of less selective pan-HDAC inhibitors, such as vorinostat, belinostat and panobinostat, which bind Zn^{2+} ions through their hydroxamic acid groups.

== Research ==
Experiments in human and murine colorectal cancer cell lines showed that zabadinostat treatment resulted in changes to the expression of immune-relevant genes, in particular, those that are linked to antigen processing (MHC class I and MHC class II genes) and natural killer (NK) cell-mediated cytotoxicity.

Further experiments showed that zabadinostat treatment in mice altered their tumour microenvironment (TME), attracting CD4^{+} and CD8^{+} tumour-infiltrating T lymphocytes, and enhancing anti-tumour activity, especially when combined with immune checkpoint inhibitors (ICIs), such as anti-PD-1 and anti-CTLA4.

In addition, mice immunized with the SARS-CoV-2 spike protein and treated with zabadinostat showed enhanced spike neutralising antibodies and an increased level of CD4^{+} and CD8^{+} T lymphocytes, suggesting potential uses beyond cancer.

== Clinical studies ==
Zabadinostat is being investigated as a treatment for late-stage cancers, including relapsed or refractory lymphoma, microsatellite stable colorectal cancer, and hepatocellular carcinoma, the most common form of liver cancer.

=== Lymphoma ===
A Phase I clinical trial (NCT01977638) conducted in late-stage cancer patients unresponsive to conventional therapy found that zabadinostat treatment resulted in anti-cancer responses for follicular lymphoma (FL), classic Hodgkin lymphoma (HL), and peripheral T-cell lymphoma (PTCL). The most common Grade 3 and above treatment-related adverse events (TRAE) were neutropenia (17%), thrombocytopenia (11%) and leukopenia (5%). Serious adverse events (SAE) were infrequent, and included neutropenic fever (3%), fatigue (1.5%), anorexia (<1%), diarrhea (<1%), and bronchial infection (<1%). No treatment-related deaths occurred on study. The recommended Phase 2 dose (RP2D) was found to be 20 mg twice daily (b.i.d.).

=== Colorectal cancer ===
A single-arm Phase II clinical trial (NCT03993626) combining zabadinostat and nivolumab showed that it was effective in treating metastatic microsatellite-stable (MSS) colorectal cancer patients who had progressed despite receiving at least two lines of systemic anti-cancer therapies. The combination therapy was well tolerated with the most frequent Grade 3 or 4 adverse events being neutropenia (18%) and anemia (7%). Immune-related adverse reactions commonly ascribed to checkpoint inhibitors were surprisingly rare although single cases of pneumonitis, hypothyroidism and hypopituitarism were seen. There were also no treatment-related deaths. Of 46 patients assessable for efficacy, 4 (9%) achieved partial response and 18 (39%) achieved stable disease, translating to an immune disease control rate of 48%. The median overall survival (OS) was 7.0 months with a 95% confidence interval of 5.13–10.22 months. The study met its primary endpoint demonstrating anti-tumour efficacy in 3rd line and above MSS colorectal cancer.

=== Liver cancer ===
In 2023, a randomized Phase II clinical trial (NCT05873244) will be conducted in hepatocellular carcinoma (HCC) patients that demonstrate resistance to immune-checkpoint inhibitor (ICI) treatment. Study patients will be randomly assigned in a 1:1 ratio to either zabadinostat plus geptanolimab (experimental arm), or the best available standard treatment, lenvatinib or sorafenib (control arm). The primary endpoint will be progression-free survival (PFS).

== History ==
Zabadinostat was originally a chemical compound (codenamed AZD-9468) synthesized by AstraZeneca. Later, AstraZeneca entered into a License Agreement with Celleron Therapeutics, granting it exclusive worldwide rights to develop and commercialize AZD-9468. During its Phase I and early Phase II development, the compound was known as CXD101, until in 2022, when the World Health Organization (WHO) included the name zabadinostat in its official list of International Nonproprietary Names (INN) for Pharmaceutical Substances. Zabadinostat is now an asset of IngenOx Therapeutics, following its formation in January 2023 from the merger of Celleron Therapeutics and Argonaut Therapeutics.
