= Mocetinostat =

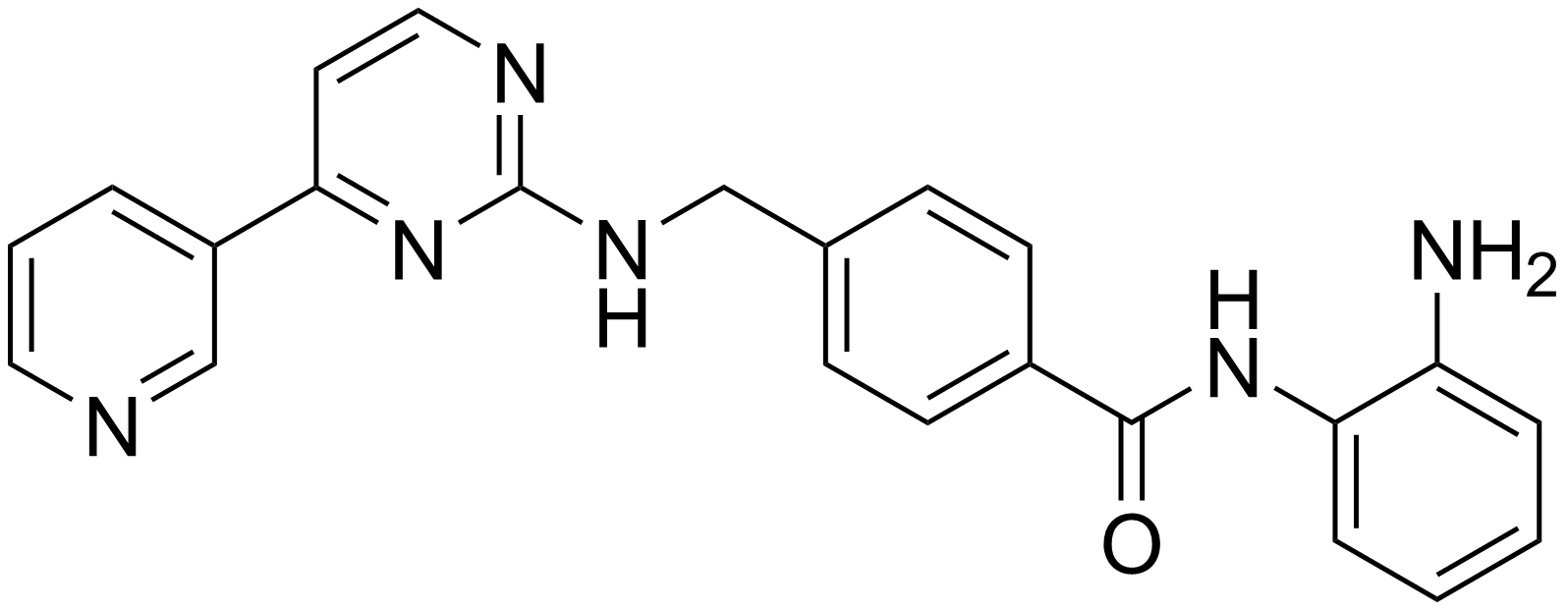

Names
- Preferred IUPAC name N-(2-Aminophenyl)-4-({[4-(pyridin-3-yl)pyrimidin-2-yl]amino}methyl)benzamide

Identifiers
CAS Number	726169-73-9
3D model (JSmol)	Interactive image
ChEBI	CHEBI:197437
ChEMBL	ChEMBL272980
ChemSpider	8041206
IUPHAR/BPS	7008
KEGG	D09641
PubChem CID	9865515
UNII	A6GWB8T96J
CompTox Dashboard (EPA)	DTXSID80222945
- InChI: InChI=1S/C23H20N6O/c24-19-5-1-2-6-21(19)28-22(30)17-9-7-16(8-10-17)14-27-23-26-13-11-20(29-23)18-4-3-12-25-15-18/h1-13,15H,14,24H2,(H,28,30)(H,26,27,29) Key: HRNLUBSXIHFDHP-UHFFFAOYSA-N; InChI=1/C23H20N6O/c24-19-5-1-2-6-21(19)28-22(30)17-9-7-16(8-10-17)14-27-23-26-13-11-20(29-23)18-4-3-12-25-15-18/h1-13,15H,14,24H2,(H,28,30)(H,26,27,29) Key: HRNLUBSXIHFDHP-UHFFFAOYAW
- SMILES: C1=CC=C(C(=C1)N)NC(=O)C2=CC=C(C=C2)CNC3=NC=CC(=N3)C4=CN=CC=C4

Properties
Chemical formula	C_{23}H_{20}N_{6}O
Molar mass	396.454 g·mol^{−1}
- Except where otherwise noted, data are given for materials in their standard state (at 25 °C [77 °F], 100 kPa). verify (what is ?) Infobox references

Mocetinostat (MGCD0103) is a benzamide histone deacetylase inhibitor undergoing clinical trials for treatment of various cancers including follicular lymphoma, Hodgkin's lymphoma and acute myelogenous leukemia.

One clinical trial (for refractory follicular lymphoma) was temporarily put on hold due to cardiac problems but resumed recruiting in 2009.

In 2010 favourable results were announced from the phase II trial for Hodgkin's lymphoma.

MGCD0103 has also been used as a research reagent where blockage of members of the HDAC-family of histone deacetylases is required.

== Mechanism of action ==
It works by inhibiting mainly histone deacetylase 1 (HDAC1), but also HDAC2, HDAC3, and HDAC11.
