= C22H30N2O2 =

The molecular formula C_{22}H_{30}N_{2}O_{2} (molar mass: 354.485 g/mol) may refer to:

- A-796,260
- Eprozinol
- Martinostat
