= Imofinostat =

Investigational drug

Clinical data
- Other names: ABT-301; MPT-0E028; TSY-410

Identifiers
- IUPAC name: (E)-3-[1-(benzenesulfonyl)-2,3-dihydroindol-5-yl]-N-hydroxyprop-2-enamide
- CAS Number: 1338320-94-7
- PubChem CID: 53464642
- ChemSpider: 32701080
- UNII: T65L58FI65

Chemical and physical data
- Formula: C_{17}H_{16}N_{2}O_{4}S
- Molar mass: 344.39 g·mol^{−1}
- 3D model (JSmol): Interactive image
- SMILES: C1CN(C2=C1C=C(C=C2)/C=C/C(=O)NO)S(=O)(=O)C3=CC=CC=C3
- InChI: InChI=InChI=1S/C17H16N2O4S/c20-17(18-21)9-7-13-6-8-16-14(12-13)10-11-19(16)24(22,23)15-4-2-1-3-5-15/h1-9,12,21H,10-11H2,(H,18,20)/b9-7+; Key:MGTIFSBCGGAZDB-VQHVLOKHSA-N

Imofinostat is an investigational new drug that is being developed by Formosa Pharmaceuticals and Anbogen Therapeutics for the treatment of colorectal cancer. It is a histone deacetylase inhibitor with selectivity for HDAC3.
