= Apicidin =

Names
- Preferred IUPAC name (3S,6S,9S,15aR)-9-[(2S)-Butan-2-yl]-6-[(1-methoxy-1H-indol-3-yl)methyl]-3-(6-oxooctyl)octahydro-2H-pyrido[1,2-a][1,4,7,10]tetraazacyclododecine-1,4,7,10(3H,12H)-tetrone

Identifiers
CAS Number	183506-66-3
3D model (JSmol)	Interactive image
ChemSpider	5293532
ECHA InfoCard	100.163.614
IUPHAR/BPS	7495
PubChem CID	6918328
UNII	ND0S9TY2E8
CompTox Dashboard (EPA)	DTXSID40274182
- InChI: InChI=1S/C34H49N5O6/c1-5-22(3)30-34(44)38-19-13-12-18-29(38)33(43)35-26(16-9-7-8-14-24(40)6-2)31(41)36-27(32(42)37-30)20-23-21-39(45-4)28-17-11-10-15-25(23)28/h10-11,15,17,21-22,26-27,29-30H,5-9,12-14,16,18-20H2,1-4H3,(H,35,43)(H,36,41)(H,37,42)/t22-,26-,27-,29+,30-/m0/s1 Key: JWOGUUIOCYMBPV-GMFLJSBRSA-N; InChI=1/C34H49N5O6/c1-5-22(3)30-34(44)38-19-13-12-18-29(38)33(43)35-26(16-9-7-8-14-24(40)6-2)31(41)36-27(32(42)37-30)20-23-21-39(45-4)28-17-11-10-15-25(23)28/h10-11,15,17,21-22,26-27,29-30H,5-9,12-14,16,18-20H2,1-4H3,(H,35,43)(H,36,41)(H,37,42)/t22-,26-,27-,29+,30-/m0/s1 Key: JWOGUUIOCYMBPV-GMFLJSBRBJ
- SMILES: CC[C@H](C)[C@H]1C(=O)N2CCCC[C@@H]2C(=O)N[C@H](C(=O)N[C@H](C(=O)N1)CC3=CN(C4=CC=CC=C43)OC)CCCCCC(=O)CC

Properties
Chemical formula	C_{34}H_{49}N_{5}O_{6}
Molar mass	623.795 g·mol^{−1}
- Except where otherwise noted, data are given for materials in their standard state (at 25 °C [77 °F], 100 kPa). Infobox references

Apicidin is a fungal metabolite, as well as a histone deacetylase inhibitor.
