= Nuclear receptor co-repressor 1 =

Protein found in humans

NCOR1
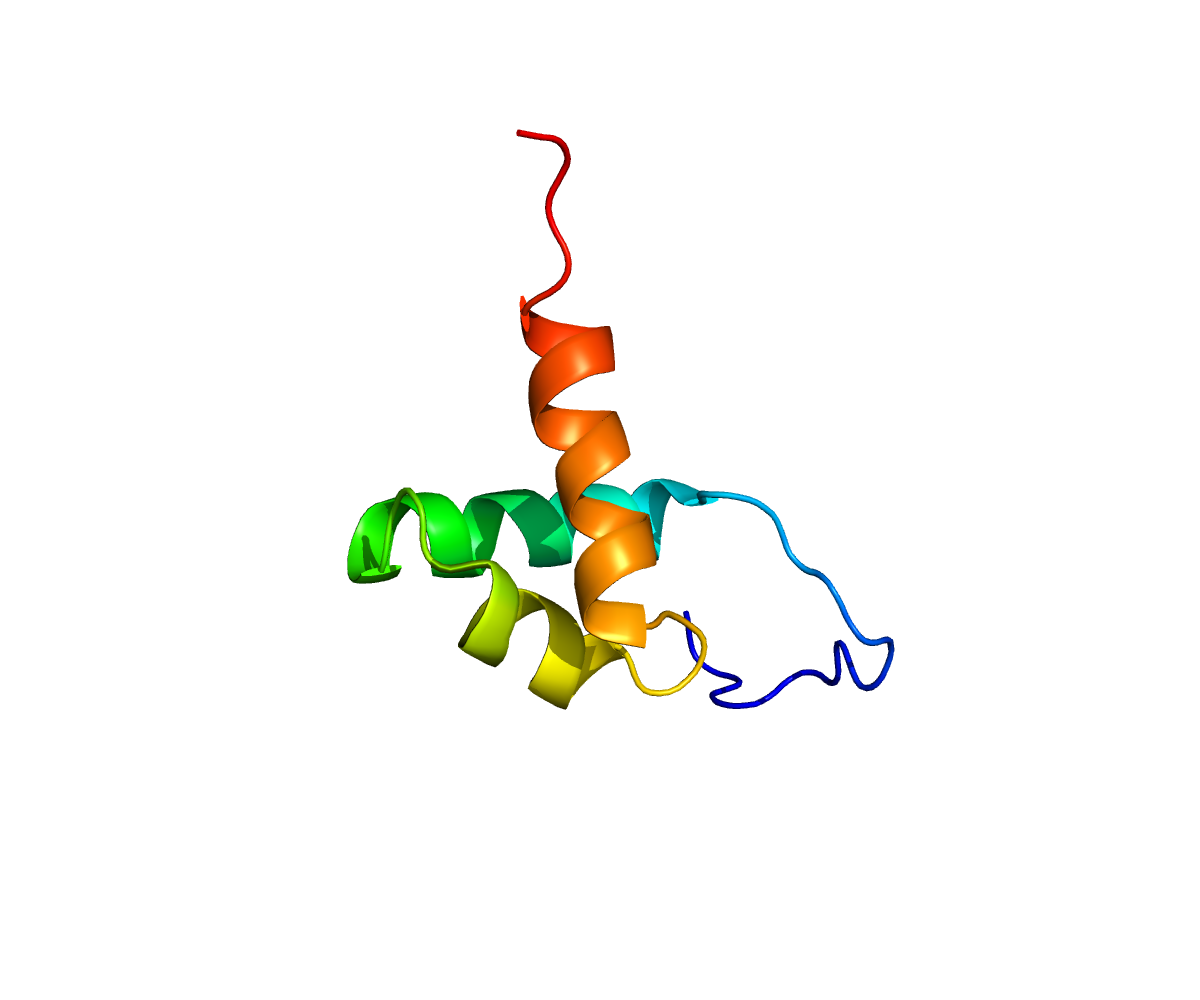

Identifiers
- Aliases: NCOR1, N-CoR, N-CoR1, PPP1R109, TRAC1, hN-CoR, nuclear receptor corepressor 1
- External IDs: OMIM: 600849; MGI: 1349717; GeneCards: NCOR1
Available structures
PDB	Ortholog search: PDBe RCSB
PDB	List of PDB id codes 2EQR, 3H52, 3KMZ, 3N00, 4MDD, 4WVD

Gene location (Human)
Chr.	Chromosome 17 (human)
Band	17p12-p11.2	Start	16,029,157 bp
Band	17p12-p11.2	End	16,218,185 bp

Gene location (Mouse)
Chr.	Chromosome 11 (mouse)
Band	11|11 B2	Start	62,207,252 bp
Band	11|11 B2	End	62,349,367 bp
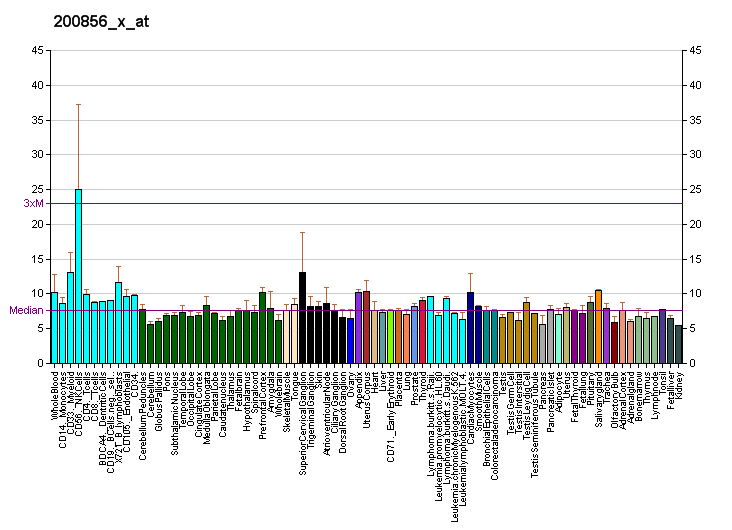

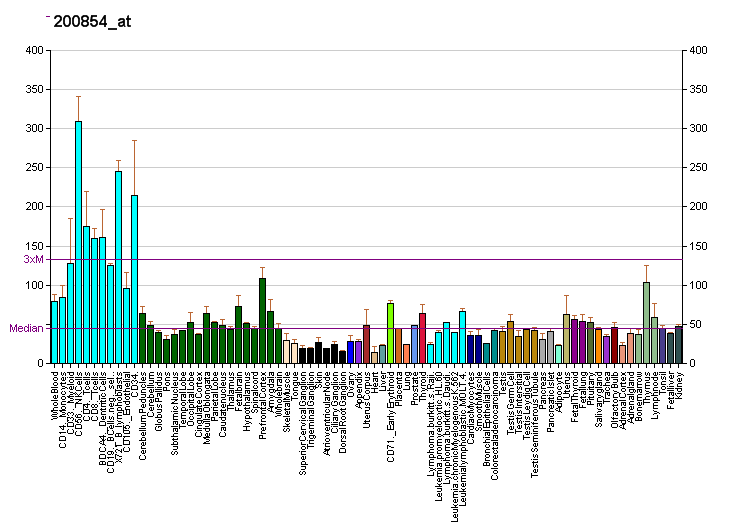

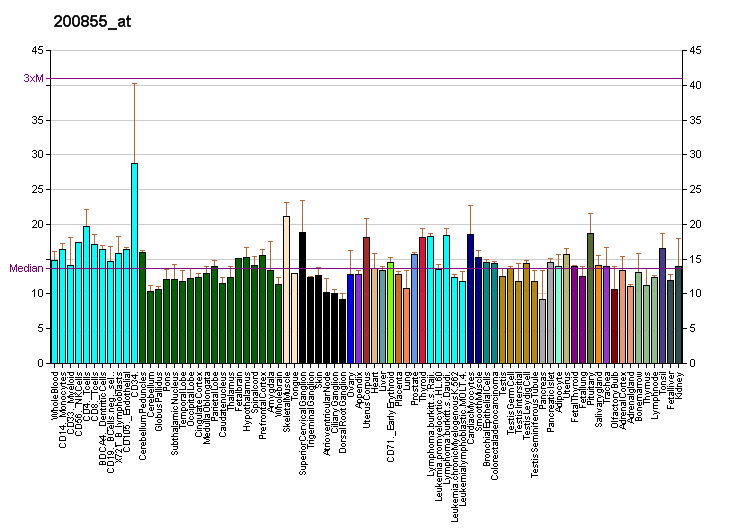
RNA expression pattern
Bgee	Human / Mouse (ortholog); Top expressed in: sural nerve; epithelium of colon; Achilles tendon; ventricular zone; testicle; gonad; mucosa of transverse colon; buccal mucosa cell; ganglionic eminence; corpus callosum / Top expressed in: tail of embryo; genital tubercle; neural layer of retina; otic vesicle; Rostral migratory stream; lacrimal gland; saccule; granulocyte; epithelium of small intestine; thymus; More reference expression data
BioGPS	More reference expression data
Gene ontology
Molecular function	DNA binding; transcription corepressor activity; histone deacetylase binding; thyroid hormone receptor binding; protein binding; nuclear receptor binding; DNA-binding transcription factor activity, RNA polymerase II-specific; chromatin binding; sequence-specific DNA binding
Cellular component	histone deacetylase complex; membrane; transcription repressor complex; Sin3 complex; spindle microtubule; nucleus; nucleoplasm; cytosol; mitotic spindle
Biological process	regulation of transcription, DNA-templated; negative regulation of transcription by RNA polymerase II; transcription by RNA polymerase II; negative regulation of production of miRNAs involved in gene silencing by miRNA; spindle assembly; negative regulation of JNK cascade; regulation of fatty acid transport; circadian rhythm; transcription, DNA-templated; regulation of lipid metabolic process; chromatin organization; negative regulation of transcription, DNA-templated; negative regulation of androgen receptor signaling pathway; locomotor rhythm; rhythmic process
Sources:Amigo / QuickGO
Orthologs
Databases	NCBI: entry; OMA: entry
Species	Human	Mouse
Entrez	9611	20185
Ensembl	ENSG00000141027	ENSMUSG00000018501
UniProt	O75376	Q60974
RefSeq (mRNA)	NM_001190438; NM_001190440; NM_006311	NM_001252313; NM_011308; NM_177229
RefSeq (protein)	NP_001177367; NP_001177369; NP_006302	n/a
Location (UCSC)	Chr 17: 16.03 – 16.22 Mb	Chr 11: 62.21 – 62.35 Mb
PubMed search
- Wikidata
View/Edit Human	View/Edit Mouse

The nuclear receptor co-repressor 1 also known as thyroid-hormone- and retinoic-acid-receptor-associated co-repressor 1 (TRAC-1) is a protein that in humans is encoded by the NCOR1 gene.

NCOR1 is a transcriptional coregulatory protein which contains several nuclear receptor interacting domains. In addition, NCOR1 appears to recruit histone deacetylases to DNA promoter regions. Hence NCOR1 assists nuclear receptors in the downregulation of gene expression.

Loss of function of this protein significantly increases the strength and power of mouse muscles.

== Family ==
It is a member of the family of nuclear receptor corepressors; the other human protein that is a member of that family is Nuclear receptor co-repressor 2.

== Interactions ==
Nuclear receptor co-repressor 1 has been shown to interact with:

- Androgen receptor,
- CHD1,
- Calcitriol receptor
- GPS2,
- Glucocorticoid receptor,
- HDAC3,
- HDAC4,
- HDAC7A,
- HDAC9,
- HEY2,
- Histone deacetylase 5,
- MAP3K7IP2,
- MECP2,
- Peroxisome proliferator-activated receptor alpha,
- Peroxisome proliferator-activated receptor gamma
- Promyelocytic leukemia protein,
- RUNX1T1,
- Retinoic acid receptor alpha,
- Retinoic acid receptor gamma,
- SAP30,
- TBL1XR1,
- TBL1X, and
- ZBTB33.
