= Nuclear receptor co-repressor 2 =

Protein found in humans

NCOR2
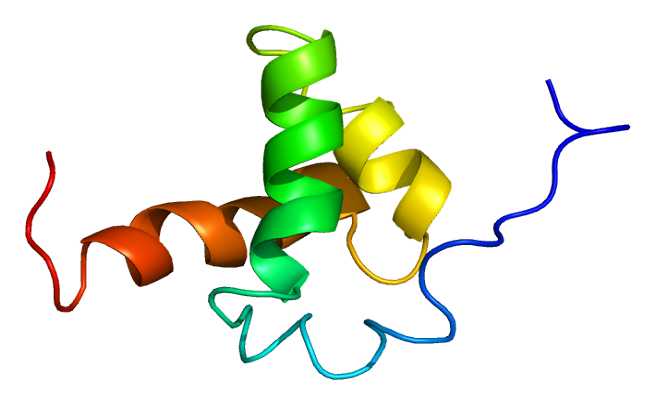

Identifiers
- Aliases: NCOR2, CTG26, N-CoR2, SMAP270, SMRT, SMRTE, SMRTE-tau, TNRC14, TRAC, TRAC-1, TRAC1, nuclear receptor corepressor 2
- External IDs: OMIM: 600848; MGI: 1337080; GeneCards: NCOR2
Available structures
| PDB | Ortholog search: PDBe RCSB |
| PDB | List of PDB id codes 2RT5, 4OAR, 2L5G, 2LTP, 1KKQ, 3R2A, 2ODD, 4A69, 3R29, 1XC5, 1R2B,%%s1KKQ, 1R2B, 1XC5, 2GPV, 2LTP, 3R29, 3R2A, 4A69, 2L5G, 2ODD, 2RT5, 4OAR |

Gene location (Human)
| Chr. | Chromosome 12 (human) |
| Band | 12q24.31 | Start | 124,324,415 bp |
| Band | 12q24.31 | End | 124,567,589 bp |

Gene location (Mouse)
| Chr. | Chromosome 5 (mouse) |
| Band | 5|5 G1.1 | Start | 125,017,153 bp |
| Band | 5|5 G1.1 | End | 125,179,219 bp |
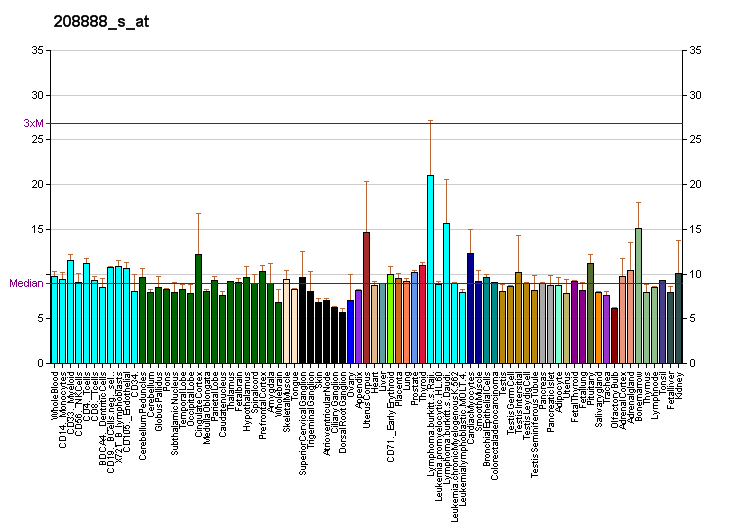

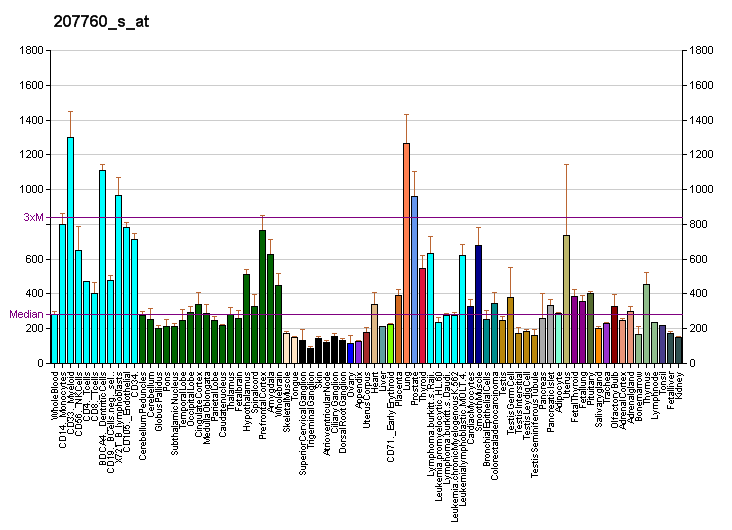

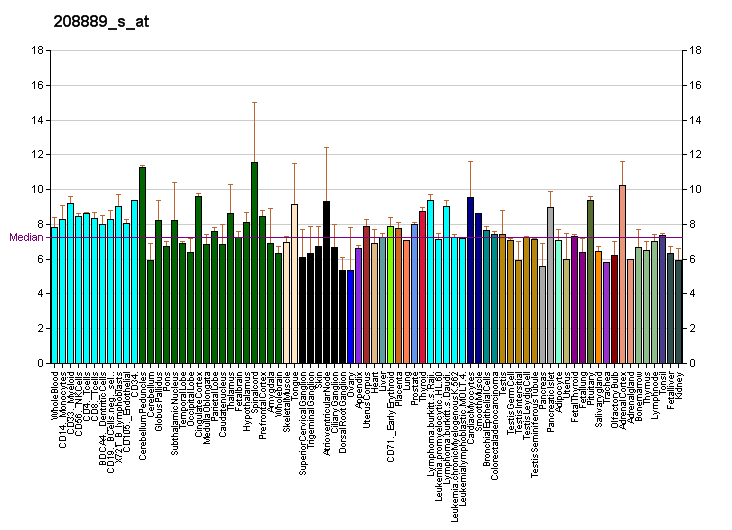
RNA expression pattern
| Bgee | Human / Mouse (ortholog); Top expressed in: sural nerve; anterior pituitary; canal of the cervix; parotid gland; right ovary; left ovary; left uterine tube; body of uterus; muscle of thigh; right hemisphere of cerebellum / Top expressed in: superior frontal gyrus; muscle of thigh; primary visual cortex; lip; Rostral migratory stream; CA3 field; ventricular zone; genital tubercle; dentate gyrus of hippocampal formation granule cell; perirhinal cortex; More reference expression data |
| BioGPS | More reference expression data |
Gene ontology
| Molecular function | transcription corepressor activity; protein N-terminus binding; histone deacetylase binding; Notch binding; DNA binding; transcription factor binding; nuclear receptor binding; protein binding; DNA-binding transcription factor activity, RNA polymerase II-specific; chromatin binding; sequence-specific DNA binding; glucocorticoid receptor binding; retinoic acid receptor binding; protein-containing complex binding; retinoid X receptor binding |
| Cellular component | transcription repressor complex; nuclear body; membrane; histone deacetylase complex; nuclear matrix; nucleoplasm; nucleus; chromatin |
| Biological process | negative regulation of production of miRNAs involved in gene silencing by miRNA; regulation of transcription, DNA-templated; transcription, DNA-templated; negative regulation of transcription by RNA polymerase II; regulation of lipid metabolic process; negative regulation of transcription, DNA-templated; negative regulation of androgen receptor signaling pathway; lactation; response to organonitrogen compound; response to estradiol; estrous cycle |
Sources:Amigo / QuickGO
Orthologs
| Databases | NCBI: entry; OMA: entry |
| Species | Human | Mouse |
| Entrez | 9612 | 20602 |
| Ensembl | ENSG00000196498 | ENSMUSG00000029478 |
| UniProt | Q9Y618 | Q9WU42 |
| RefSeq (mRNA) | NM_006312; NM_001077261; NM_001206654 | NM_001253904; NM_001253905; NM_011424 |
| RefSeq (protein) | NP_001070729; NP_001193583; NP_006303; NP_001193583.1 | NP_001240833; NP_001240834; NP_035554 |
| Location (UCSC) | Chr 12: 124.32 – 124.57 Mb | Chr 5: 125.02 – 125.18 Mb |
| PubMed search |
- Wikidata
| View/Edit Human | View/Edit Mouse |

The nuclear receptor co-repressor 2 (NCOR2) is a transcriptional coregulatory protein that contains several nuclear receptor-interacting domains. In addition, NCOR2 appears to recruit histone deacetylases to DNA promoter regions. Hence NCOR2 assists nuclear receptors in the down regulation of target gene expression. NCOR2 is also referred to as a silencing mediator for retinoid or thyroid-hormone receptors (SMRT) or T_{3} receptor-associating cofactor 1 (TRAC-1).

== Function ==
NCOR2/SMRT is a transcriptional coregulatory protein that contains several modulatory functional domains including multiple autonomous repression domains as well as two or three C-terminal nuclear receptor-interacting domains. NCOR2/SMRT serves as a repressive coregulatory factor (corepressor) for multiple transcription factor pathways. In this regard, NCOR2/SMRT functions as a platform protein, facilitating the recruitment of histone deacetylases to the DNA promoters bound by its interacting transcription factors.

== Family ==
It is a member of the family of nuclear receptor corepressors; the other human protein that is a member of that family is Nuclear receptor co-repressor 1.

== Discovery ==
SMRT was initially cloned and characterized in the laboratory of Dr. Ronald M. Evans at the Salk Institute for Biological Studies. In another early investigation into this molecule, similar findings were reported in a variant referred to as TRAC-1.

== Interactions ==
Nuclear receptor co-repressor 2 has been shown to interact with:

- AR
- BCL6
- C-Fos
- C-jun
- HDAC1
- HDAC3
- HDAC4
- HDAC5
- HDAC10
- MeCP2
- NR4A1
- POU2F1
- PPARD
- PGR
- PML
- RBPJ
- RELA
- RUNX1T1
- RARA
- SIN3A
- SNW1
- SPEN
- SRF
- TBL1X
- THRB
- VDR
- ZBTB16
