= Belinostat =

Pharmaceutical drug

Clinical data
- Trade names: Beleodaq
- Other names: PXD101
- AHFS/Drugs.com: beleodaq
- Routes of administration: Intravenous (IV)
- ATC code: L01XH04 (WHO)

Legal status
- Legal status: US: ℞-only

Pharmacokinetic data
- Bioavailability: 100% (IV)
- Protein binding: 92.9–95.8%
- Metabolism: UGT1A1
- Excretion: Urine

Identifiers
- IUPAC name: (2E)-N-Hydroxy-3-[3-(phenylsulfamoyl)phenyl]prop-2-enamide
- CAS Number: 866323-14-0
- PubChem CID: 6918638
- DrugBank: DB05015
- ChemSpider: 5293831
- UNII: F4H96P17NZ
- KEGG: D08870
- ChEBI: CHEBI:61076
- ChEMBL: ChEMBL408513
- CompTox Dashboard (EPA): DTXSID60194378

Chemical and physical data
- Formula: C_{15}H_{14}N_{2}O_{4}S
- Molar mass: 318.35 g·mol^{−1}
- 3D model (JSmol): Interactive image
- SMILES: O=S(=O)(Nc1ccccc1)c2cc(\C=C\C(=O)NO)ccc2
- InChI: InChI=1S/C15H14N2O4S/c18-15(16-19)10-9-12-5-4-8-14(11-12)22(20,21)17-13-6-2-1-3-7-13/h1-11,17,19H,(H,16,18)/b10-9+; Key:NCNRHFGMJRPRSK-MDZDMXLPSA-N

Belinostat (trade name Beleodaq, previously known as PXD101) is a histone deacetylase inhibitor drug developed by TopoTarget for the treatment of hematological malignancies and solid tumors.

It was approved in July 2014 by the US FDA to treat peripheral T-cell lymphoma.

In 2007 preliminary results were released from the Phase II clinical trial of intravenous belinostat in combination with carboplatin and paclitaxel for relapsed ovarian cancer. Final results in late 2009 of a phase II trial for T-cell lymphoma were encouraging. Belinostat has been granted orphan drug and fast track designation by the FDA, and was approved in the US for the use against peripheral T-cell lymphoma on 3 July 2014. It is not approved in Europe as of August 2014.

The approved pharmaceutical formulation is given intravenously. Belinostat is primarily metabolized by UGT1A1; the initial dose should be reduced if the recipient is known to be homozygous for the UGT1A1*28 allele.
