= Histone deacetylase 5 =

Enzyme found in humans

HDAC5

Identifiers
- Aliases: HDAC5, HD5, NY-CO-9, histone deacetylase 5
- External IDs: OMIM: 605315; MGI: 1333784; GeneCards: HDAC5
Enzyme activity
EC #	BRENDA	ExPASy	KEGG	MetaCyc
3.5.1.98	↗	↗	↗	↗

Gene location (Human)
Chr.	Chromosome 17 (human)
Band	17q21.31	Start	44,076,746 bp
Band	17q21.31	End	44,123,702 bp

Gene location (Mouse)
Chr.	Chromosome 11 (mouse)
Band	11|11 D	Start	102,194,432 bp
Band	11|11 D	End	102,230,166 bp
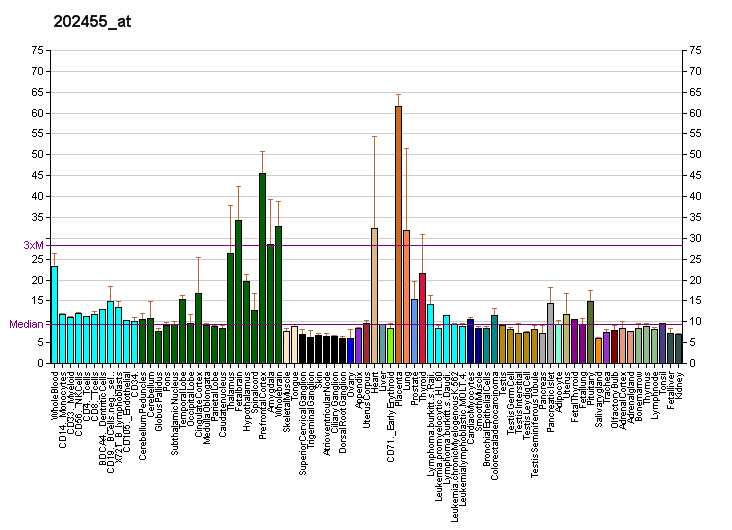
RNA expression pattern
Bgee	Human / Mouse (ortholog); Top expressed in: skin of leg; skin of abdomen; ganglionic eminence; muscle of thigh; right frontal lobe; popliteal artery; tibial arteries; right hemisphere of cerebellum; apex of heart; gastric mucosa / Top expressed in: neural layer of retina; perirhinal cortex; entorhinal cortex; CA3 field; primary visual cortex; dentate gyrus of hippocampal formation granule cell; superior frontal gyrus; lip; muscle of thigh; central gray substance of midbrain; More reference expression data
BioGPS	More reference expression data
Gene ontology
Molecular function	NAD-dependent histone deacetylase activity (H3-K14 specific); protein deacetylase activity; histone deacetylase binding; chromatin binding; metal ion binding; protein binding; hydrolase activity; protein kinase C binding; histone deacetylase activity; transcription factor binding; RNA polymerase II cis-regulatory region sequence-specific DNA binding
Cellular component	Golgi apparatus; histone deacetylase complex; cytoplasm; nucleus; nucleoplasm; cytosol; nuclear speck; protein-containing complex
Biological process	histone H3 deacetylation; chromatin remodeling; regulation of myotube differentiation; regulation of transcription, DNA-templated; regulation of gene expression, epigenetic; positive regulation of DNA-binding transcription factor activity; regulation of histone H3-K9 acetylation; response to activity; transcription, DNA-templated; protein deacetylation; negative regulation of cell migration involved in sprouting angiogenesis; B cell activation; neuron differentiation; negative regulation of myotube differentiation; cellular response to insulin stimulus; B cell differentiation; inflammatory response; regulation of protein binding; negative regulation of transcription, DNA-templated; cellular response to lipopolysaccharide; positive regulation of transcription by RNA polymerase II; response to cocaine; negative regulation of transcription by RNA polymerase II; histone deacetylation; chromatin organization
Sources:Amigo / QuickGO
Orthologs
Databases	NCBI: entry; OMA: entry
Species	Human	Mouse
Entrez	10014	15184
Ensembl	ENSG00000108840	ENSMUSG00000008855
UniProt	Q9UQL6	Q9Z2V6
RefSeq (mRNA)	NM_001015053; NM_005474; NM_139205; NM_001382393	NM_001077696; NM_001284248; NM_001284249; NM_001284250; NM_010412 NM_001361596
RefSeq (protein)	NP_001015053; NP_005465; NP_001369322	n/a
Location (UCSC)	Chr 17: 44.08 – 44.12 Mb	Chr 11: 102.19 – 102.23 Mb
PubMed search
- Wikidata
View/Edit Human	View/Edit Mouse

Histone deacetylase 5 is an enzyme that in humans is encoded by the HDAC5 gene.

== Function ==
Histones play a critical role in transcriptional regulation, cell cycle progression, and developmental events. Histone acetylation/deacetylation alters chromosome structure and affects transcription factor access to DNA. The protein encoded by this gene belongs to the class II histone deacetylase/acuc/apha family. It possesses histone deacetylase activity and represses transcription when tethered to a promoter. It coimmunoprecipitates only with HDAC3 family member and might form multicomplex proteins. It also interacts with myocyte enhancer factor-2 (MEF2) proteins, resulting in repression of MEF2-dependent genes. This gene is thought to be associated with colon cancer. Two transcript variants encoding different isoforms have been found for this gene.

AMP-activated protein kinase regulation of the glucose transporter GLUT4 occurs by phosphorylation of HDAC5.

HDAC5 is involved in memory consolidation and suggests that development of more selective HDAC inhibitors for the treatment of Alzheimer's disease should avoid targeting HDAC5. Its function can be effectively examined by siRNA knockdown based on an independent validation.

HDAC5 overexpression in urothelial carcinoma cell lines inhibits long-term proliferation but can promote epithelial-to-mesenchymal transition (EMT)

== Interactions ==
Histone deacetylase 5 has been shown to interact with:

- BCL6,
- CBX5,
- GATA1,
- HDAC3,
- IKZF1,
- MEF2A,
- NRIP1,
- NCOR1,
- NCOR2,
- YWHAQ, and
- ZBTB16.

== See also ==
- Histone deacetylase
