= HDAC9 =

Protein-coding gene in the species Homo sapiens

Identifiers
- Aliases: HDAC9, HD7, HD7b, HD9, HDAC, HDAC7, HDAC7B, HDAC9B, HDAC9FL, HDRP, MITR, histone deacetylase 9
- External IDs: OMIM: 606543; MGI: 1931221; GeneCards: HDAC9
Available structures
PDB	Ortholog search: PDBe RCSB
PDB	List of PDB id codes 1TQE
Enzyme activity
EC #	BRENDA	ExPASy	KEGG	MetaCyc
3.5.1.98	↗	↗	↗	↗

Gene location (Human)
Chr.	Chromosome 7 (human)
Band	7p21.1	Start	18,086,949 bp
Band	7p21.1	End	19,002,416 bp

Gene location (Mouse)
Chr.	Chromosome 12 (mouse)
Band	12|12 A3	Start	34,097,579 bp
Band	12|12 A3	End	34,967,094 bp
RNA expression pattern
Bgee	Human / Mouse (ortholog); Top expressed in: oocyte; monocyte; secondary oocyte; endothelial cell; Epithelium of choroid plexus; parotid gland; ganglionic eminence; Skeletal muscle tissue of rectus abdominis; ventricular zone; gonad / Top expressed in: interventricular septum; neural layer of retina; secondary oocyte; zygote; dentate gyrus of hippocampal formation granule cell; Region I of hippocampus proper; ascending aorta; visual cortex; piriform cortex; left ventricle; More reference expression data
BioGPS	n/a
Gene ontology
Molecular function	NAD-dependent histone deacetylase activity (H3-K14 specific); transcription corepressor activity; histone deacetylase activity; protein deacetylase activity; transcription factor binding; histone deacetylase binding; metal ion binding; protein binding; hydrolase activity; protein kinase C binding; histone deacetylase activity (H4-K16 specific)
Cellular component	cytoplasm; histone deacetylase complex; transcription regulator complex; nucleoplasm; nucleus; histone methyltransferase complex
Biological process	histone H3 deacetylation; peptidyl-lysine deacetylation; regulation of transcription, DNA-templated; positive regulation of cell migration involved in sprouting angiogenesis; response to amphetamine; negative regulation of transcription by RNA polymerase II; regulation of striated muscle cell differentiation; transcription, DNA-templated; B cell activation; development of the heart; histone H4 deacetylation; neuron differentiation; cellular response to insulin stimulus; regulation of skeletal muscle fiber development; B cell differentiation; inflammatory response; negative regulation of transcription, DNA-templated; chromatin organization; histone deacetylation; cholesterol homeostasis; negative regulation of lipoprotein lipase activity; histone H4-K16 deacetylation
Sources:Amigo / QuickGO
Orthologs
Databases	NCBI: entry; OMA: entry
Species	Human	Mouse
Entrez	9734	79221
Ensembl	ENSG00000048052	ENSMUSG00000004698
UniProt	Q9UKV0	Q99N13
RefSeq (mRNA)	NM_001204144; NM_001204145; NM_001204146; NM_001204147; NM_001204148 NM_014707; NM_058176; NM_058177; NM_178423; NM_178425; NM_001321868; NM_001321869; NM_001321870; NM_001321871; NM_001321872; NM_001321873; NM_001321874; NM_001321875; NM_001321876; NM_001321877; NM_001321878; NM_001321879; NM_001321884; NM_001321885; NM_001321886; NM_001321887; NM_001321888; NM_001321889; NM_001321890; NM_001321891; NM_001321893; NM_001321894; NM_001321895; NM_001321896; NM_001321897; NM_001321898; NM_001321899; NM_001321900; NM_001321901; NM_001321902	NM_001271386; NM_024124
RefSeq (protein)	NP_001191073; NP_001191074; NP_001191075; NP_001191076; NP_001191077 NP_001308797; NP_001308798; NP_001308799; NP_001308800; NP_001308801; NP_001308802; NP_001308803; NP_001308804; NP_001308805; NP_001308806; NP_001308807; NP_001308808; NP_001308813; NP_001308814; NP_001308815; NP_001308816; NP_001308817; NP_001308818; NP_001308819; NP_001308820; NP_001308822; NP_001308823; NP_001308824; NP_001308825; NP_001308826; NP_001308827; NP_001308828; NP_001308829; NP_001308830; NP_001308831; NP_055522; NP_478056; NP_848510; NP_848512	NP_001258315; NP_077038
Location (UCSC)	Chr 7: 18.09 – 19 Mb	Chr 12: 34.1 – 34.97 Mb
PubMed search
- Wikidata
View/Edit Human	View/Edit Mouse

Histone deacetylase 9 is an enzyme that in humans is encoded by the HDAC9 gene.

== Function ==
Histones play a critical role in transcriptional regulation, cell cycle progression, and developmental events. Histone acetylation/deacetylation alters chromosome structure and affects transcription factor access to DNA. The protein encoded by this gene has sequence homology to members of the histone deacetylase family. This gene is orthologous to the Xenopus and mouse MITR genes. The MITR protein lacks the histone deacetylase catalytic domain. It represses MEF2 activity through recruitment of multicomponent corepressor complexes that include CtBP and HDACs. This encoded protein may play a role in hematopoiesis. Multiple alternatively spliced transcripts have been described for this gene but the full-length nature of some of them has not been determined.

Histone deacetylase 9 (HDAC9), a member of class II HDACs, regulates a wide variety of normal and abnormal physiological functions.

Histones play a critical role in transcriptional regulation, cell cycle progression, and developmental events. Histone acetylation/deacetylation alters chromosome structure and affects transcription factor access to DNA. The protein encoded by this gene has sequence homology to members of the histone deacetylase family. This gene is orthologous to the Xenopus and mouse MITR genes. The MITR protein lacks the histone deacetylase catalytic domain. It represses MEF2 activity through recruitment of multicomponent corepressor complexes that include CtBP and HDACs. This encoded protein may play a role in hematopoiesis. Multiple alternatively spliced transcripts have been described for this gene but the full-length nature of some of them has not been determined.

== Research ==
=== intracranial aneurysm ===
HDAC9 and BCL2L11 are upregulated while miR-92a was downregulated in clinical samples and rat models of intracranial aneurysm (IA). HDAC9 inhibition or miR-92a elevation improved pathological changes and repressed apoptosis and expression of MMP-2, MMP-9, VEGF and inflammatory factors in vascular tissues from IA rats. Oppositely, HDAC9 overexpression or miR-92a reduction had contrary effects. miR-92a downregulation reversed the effect of silenced HDAC9 on IA rats. HDAC9 inhibition upregulates miR-92a to repress the progression of IA via silencing BCL2L11.

Data partially confirmed earlier results and showed that variants in CDKN2B-AS1, RP1, and HDAC9 could be genetic susceptibility factors for IA in a Chinese population.

=== ischemic brain injury ===
Histone deacetylase 9 (HDAC9) has been reported to be elevated in ischemic brain injury, but its mechanism in stroke is still enigmatic. CTCF inhibited miR-383-5p expression via its enrichment in the promoter region of miR-383-5p, whereas the miR-383-5p targeted and inhibited HDAC9 expression. In the oxygen glucose deprivation cell model and the middle cerebral artery occlusion rat model, elevation of HDAC9 is regulated by the CTCF/miR-383-5p/HDAC9 pathway mediated apoptosis induced by endoplasmic reticulum stress, while reduction of HDAC9 alleviated apoptosis and the symptoms of cerebral infarction in MCAO rats. Thus, the CTCF/miR-383-5p/HDAC9 pathway may present a target for drug development against ischemic brain injury 6).

HDAC9 is highly expressed in MCAO mice and oxygen glucose deprivation (OGD) stimulated cells. Silencing of HDAC9 inhibited neuronal apoptosis and inflammatory factor release in vitro. HDAC9 downregulated miR-20a by enriching in its promoter region, while silencing of HDCA9 promoted miR-20a expression. miR-20a targeted Neurod1 and down-regulated its expression. Silencing of HDAC9 diminished OGD-induced neuronal apoptosis and inflammatory factor release in vitro as well as ischemic brain injury in vivo by regulating the miR-20a/NeuroD1 signaling. HDAC9 silencing may retard ischemic brain injury through miR-20a/Neurod1 signaling.

=== Glioblastoma ===
HDAC9 is over-expressed in prognostically poor glioblastoma patients. Knockdown HDAC9 decreased proliferation in vitro and tumor formation in vivo. HDAC9 accelerated cell cycle in part by potentiating the EGFR signaling pathway. Also, HDAC9 interacted with TAZ, a key downstream effector of Hippo pathway. Knockdown of HDAC9 decreased the expression of TAZ. We found that overexpressed TAZ in HDAC9-knockdown cells abrogated the effects induced by HDAC9 silencing both in vitro and in vivo. HDAC9 promotes tumor formation of glioblastoma via TAZ-mediated EGFR pathway activation.

=== Saethre-Chotzen syndrome ===
HDAC9 was suggested to contribute to developmental delay in Saethre-Chotzen syndrome (SCS) patients with 7p21 mirodeletions.

=== Motor innervation control of gene expression ===
Motor innervation controls chromatin acetylation in skeletal muscle and that histone deacetylase 9 (HDAC9) is a signal-responsive transcriptional repressor which is downregulated upon denervation, with consequent upregulation of chromatin acetylation and AChR expression. Forced expression of Hdac9 in denervated muscle prevents upregulation of activity-dependent genes and chromatin acetylation by linking myocyte enhancer factor 2 (MEF2) and class I HDACs. By contrast, Hdac9-null mice are supersensitive to denervation-induced changes in gene expression and show chromatin hyperacetylation and delayed perinatal downregulation of myogenin, an activator of AChR genes. These findings show a molecular mechanism to account for the control of chromatin acetylation by presynaptic neurons and the activity-dependent regulation of skeletal muscle genes by motor innervation.

== Interactions ==
HDAC9 has been shown to interact with:

- IKK1,
- IKK2,
- CBX5,
- HDAC3,
- BTG2,
- Myocyte-specific enhancer factor 2A
- Nuclear receptor co-repressor 1,
- SIN3A, and
- SUV39H1.

== See also ==
- Histone deacetylase
