= HDAC7 =

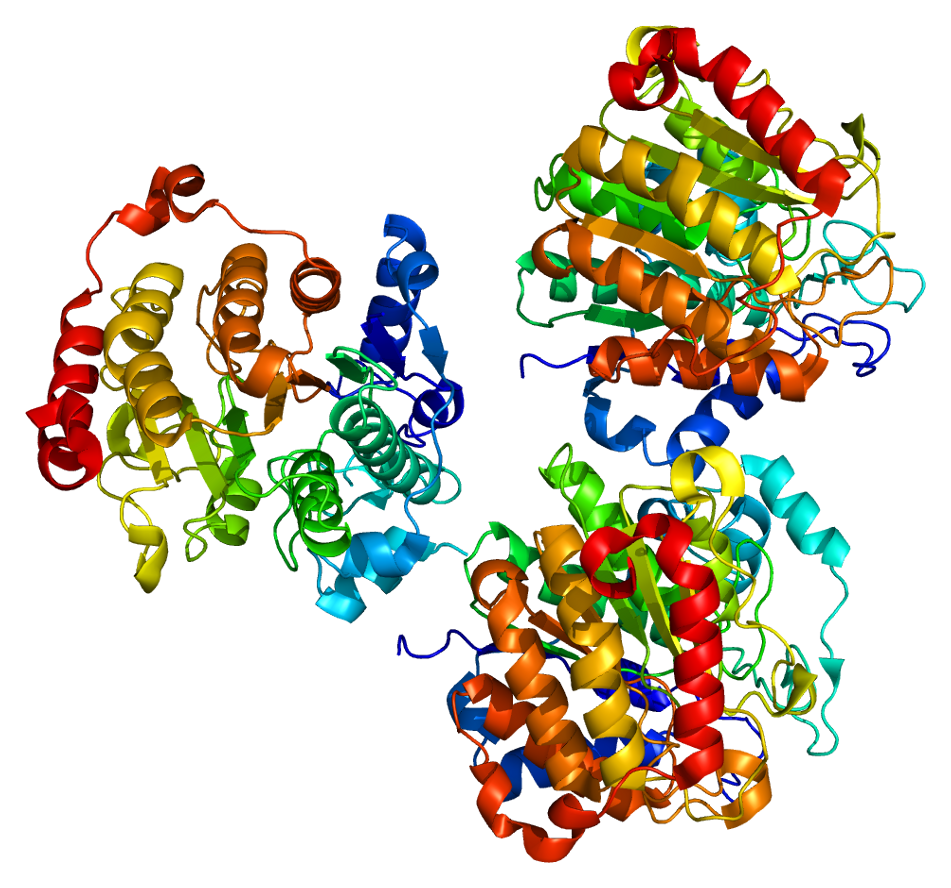

Identifiers
- Aliases: HDAC7, HD7A, HDAC7A, HD7, histone deacetylase 7
- External IDs: OMIM: 606542; MGI: 1891835; GeneCards: HDAC7
Available structures
PDB	Ortholog search: PDBe RCSB
PDB	List of PDB id codes 3C0Y, 3C0Z, 3C10, 3ZNR, 3ZNS
Enzyme activity
EC #	BRENDA	ExPASy	KEGG	MetaCyc
3.5.1.98	↗	↗	↗	↗

Gene location (Human)
Chr.	Chromosome 12 (human)
Band	12q13.11	Start	47,782,722 bp
Band	12q13.11	End	47,833,132 bp

Gene location (Mouse)
Chr.	Chromosome 15 (mouse)
Band	15|15 F1	Start	97,690,545 bp
Band	15|15 F1	End	97,742,383 bp
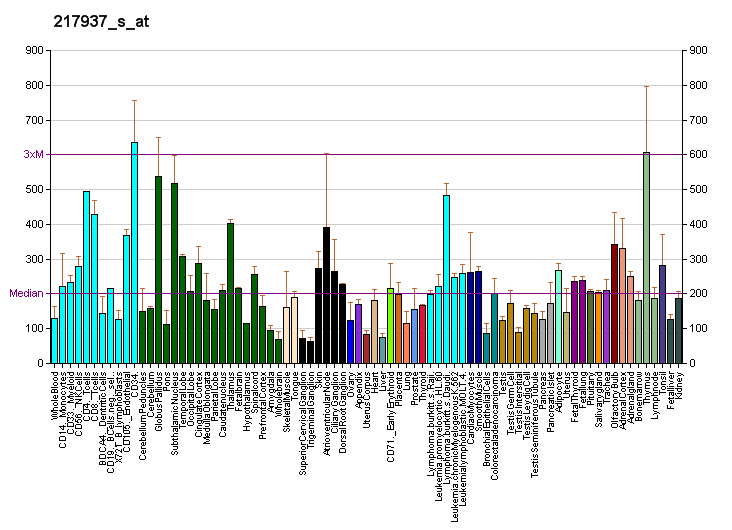
RNA expression pattern
Bgee	Human / Mouse (ortholog); Top expressed in: sural nerve; gastric mucosa; left uterine tube; body of uterus; apex of heart; upper lobe of left lung; left adrenal cortex; canal of the cervix; right ovary; right uterine tube / Top expressed in: thymus; genital tubercle; corneal stroma; otic vesicle; entorhinal cortex; perirhinal cortex; lactiferous gland; ascending aorta; aortic valve; tail of embryo; More reference expression data
BioGPS	More reference expression data
Gene ontology
Molecular function	metal ion binding; transcription corepressor activity; protein kinase binding; 14-3-3 protein binding; hydrolase activity; protein kinase C binding; chromatin binding; histone deacetylase activity; NAD-dependent histone deacetylase activity (H3-K14 specific); protein binding; SUMO transferase activity
Cellular component	nucleoplasm; cytoplasm; nucleus; histone deacetylase complex; cytosol
Biological process	transcription, DNA-templated; negative regulation of NIK/NF-kappaB signaling; positive regulation of cell migration involved in sprouting angiogenesis; cell-cell junction assembly; vasculogenesis; negative regulation of transcription by RNA polymerase II; histone H3 deacetylation; negative regulation of osteoblast differentiation; negative regulation of interleukin-2 production; regulation of transcription, DNA-templated; histone deacetylation; negative regulation of transcription, DNA-templated; chromatin organization; protein sumoylation
Sources:Amigo / QuickGO
Orthologs
Databases	NCBI: entry; OMA: entry
Species	Human	Mouse
Entrez	51564	56233
Ensembl	ENSG00000061273	ENSMUSG00000022475
UniProt	Q8WUI4	Q8C2B3
RefSeq (mRNA)	NM_001098416; NM_001308090; NM_015401; NM_016596; NM_001368046	NM_001204275; NM_001204276; NM_001204277; NM_001204278; NM_001204279 NM_001204280; NM_001204281; NM_019572; NM_001378971
RefSeq (protein)	NP_001091886; NP_001295019; NP_056216; NP_001354975	NP_001191204; NP_001191205; NP_001191206; NP_001191207; NP_001191208 NP_001191209; NP_001191210; NP_062518; NP_001365900
Location (UCSC)	Chr 12: 47.78 – 47.83 Mb	Chr 15: 97.69 – 97.74 Mb
PubMed search
- Wikidata
View/Edit Human	View/Edit Mouse

Histone deacetylase 7 is an enzyme that in humans is encoded by the HDAC7 gene.

== Gene ==
Multiple alternatively spliced transcript variants encoding several isoforms have been found for this gene.

== Structure ==
DAC7 has both structural and functional similarity to HDACs 4, 5, and 9, as these four HDACs make up the Class IIa of HDACs in higher eukaryotes.

== Function ==
Histones play a critical role in transcriptional regulation, cell cycle progression, and developmental events. Histone acetylation/deacetylation alters chromosome structure and affects transcription factor access to DNA. The protein encoded by this gene has sequence homology to members of the histone deacetylase family. This gene is orthologous to mouse HDAC7 gene whose protein promotes repression mediated via transcriptional corepressor SMRT.

HClass IIa HDACs are phosphorylated by calcium/calmodulin dependent-kindase (CaMK) and protein kinase D (PKD) in response to kinase-dependent signaling. HDAC7 possesses little intrinsic deacetylase activity and therefore requires association with the class I HDAC, HDAC3 in order to suppress gene expression. It has been demonstrated through crystal structures of the human HDAC7 that the catalytic domain of HDAC7 has an additional class IIa HDAC-specific zinc binding motif adjacent to the active site. This is most likely to allow for substrate recognition and protein-protein interactions that are necessary for class IIa HDAC enzymes.

Although HDAC7 has shown to have little intrinsic deacetylase activity, studies have shown that HDAC7 may have various alternative functions related to development, proliferation, and inflammation.

One study showed that HDAC7 suppresses proliferation and β-catenin activity in chondrocytes. This was shown by knocking out HDAC7 in mice, which then resulted in increased levels of the cell cycle regulator, cyclin D3; decreased levels of the tumor suppressor, p21; and increased levels of active beta-catenin. Since each of these contribute to regulating cell proliferation, deletion of HDAC7 increased chondrocyte proliferation. This study also showed that signaling via the insulin/Insulin-like growth factor 1 receptor led to increased levels of HDAC7 in the cytosol than the nucleus and increased levels of active β-catenin, indicating that HDAC7 associates with β-catenin. During chondrogenesis, HDAC7 is translocated to the cytosol to be degraded, indicating that generally HDAC7 represses β-catenin activity in chondrocytes.

Another study supported the conclusion that HDAC7 and β-catenin associate together by demonstrating that HDAC7 controls endothelial cell growth through modulation of β-catenin. This was shown in the opposite way from the previous study, in that HDAC7 was overexpressed rather than removed. They found that overexpression of HDAC7 prevented nuclear translocation of β-catenin which then coincided with downregulation of the cell cycle regulator, cyclin D1. Overall, this study demonstrated that HDAC7 once again interacts with β-catenin to keep endothelial cells in a low proliferation stage.

== Clinical signifance ==
Not only does HDAC7 play a role in the proliferation of cell growth in chondrocytes and endothelial cells, but it has also been demonstrated that HDAC7 is a crucial player in cancer cell proliferation through a study that showed mechanistic insight into the contribution of HDAC7 to tumor progression. This study showed that knockdown of HDAC7 resulted in significant cell arrest between the G(1) and S phases of the cell cycle. Subsequently, HDAC7 knockdown suppressed c-Myc expression which in turn blocked cell cycle progression. Through chromatin immunoprecipitation assays, it was shown that HDAC7 directly binds with the c-Myc gene and therefore HDAC7 silencing decreased c-Myc mRNA levels.

Outside of proliferation, an additional study demonstrated that HDAC7 promotes inflammatory responses in macrophages. This was shown by overexpression of HDAC7 in inflammatory macrophages in mice. This overexpression promoted lipopolysaccharide (LPS)-inducible expression of HDAC-dependent genes via a HIF-1alpha-dependent mechanism. This demonstrated that HDAC7 may be a viable target for developing new anti-inflammatory drugs.

In this vein, TMP195 and JM63 are the most potent HDAC7 inhibitors. However, both compounds are not selective amongst class IIa HDACs, pointing to the need to develop HDAC7 selective inhibitors to further validate HDAC7 as an anti-inflammatory target.

== Interactions ==
HDAC7A has been shown to interact with:

- BCL6,
- Endothelin receptor type A,
- HDAC3,
- HTATIP,
- IKZF1, and
- Nuclear receptor co-repressor 1.

== See also ==
- Histone deacetylase
