= HDAC6 =

Protein-coding gene in the species Homo sapiens

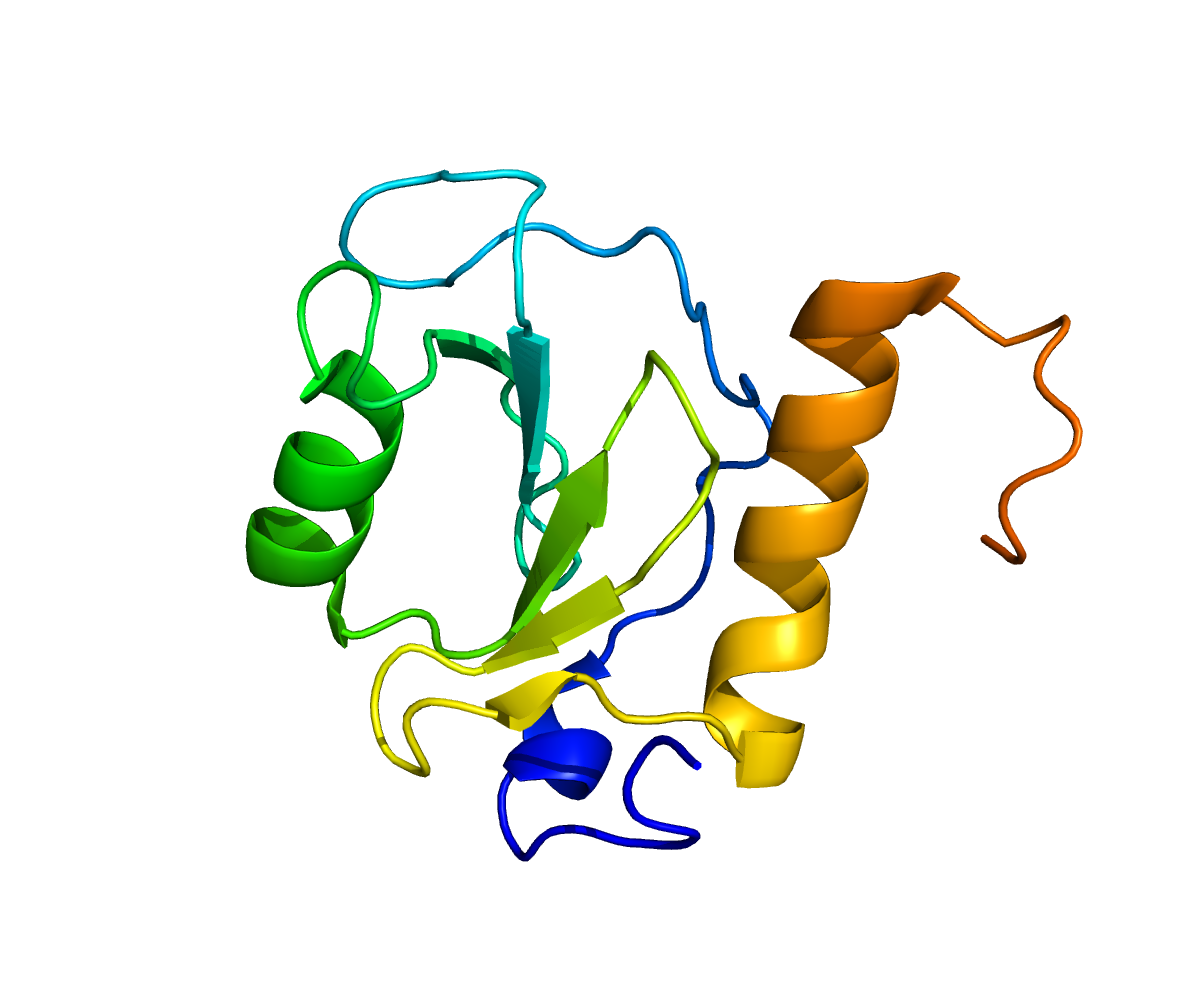

Identifiers
- Aliases: HDAC6, CPBHM, HD6, PPP1R90, JM21, histone deacetylase 6
- External IDs: OMIM: 300272; MGI: 1333752; GeneCards: HDAC6
Available structures
PDB	Ortholog search: PDBe RCSB
PDB	List of PDB id codes 3C5K, 3GV4, 3PHD, 5EDU, 5KH7

Gene location (Human)
Chr.	X chromosome (human)
Band	Xp11.23	Start	48,801,377 bp
Band	Xp11.23	End	48,824,982 bp

Gene location (Mouse)
Chr.	X chromosome (mouse)
Band	X A1.1|X 3.58 cM	Start	7,796,359 bp
Band	X A1.1|X 3.58 cM	End	7,814,128 bp
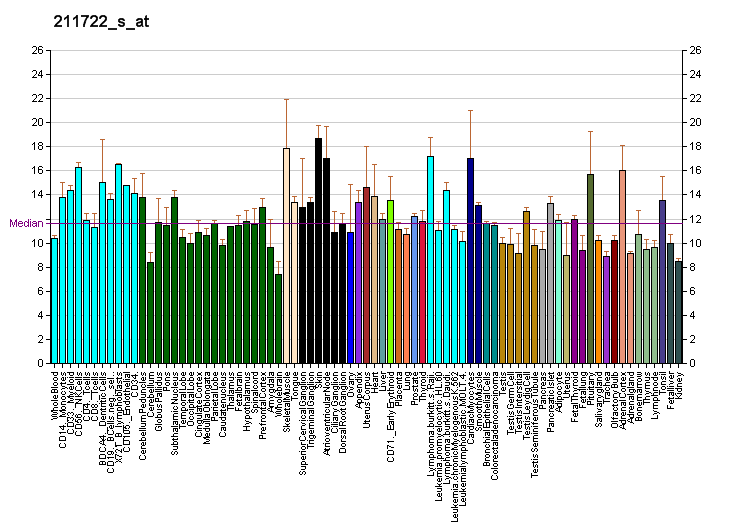

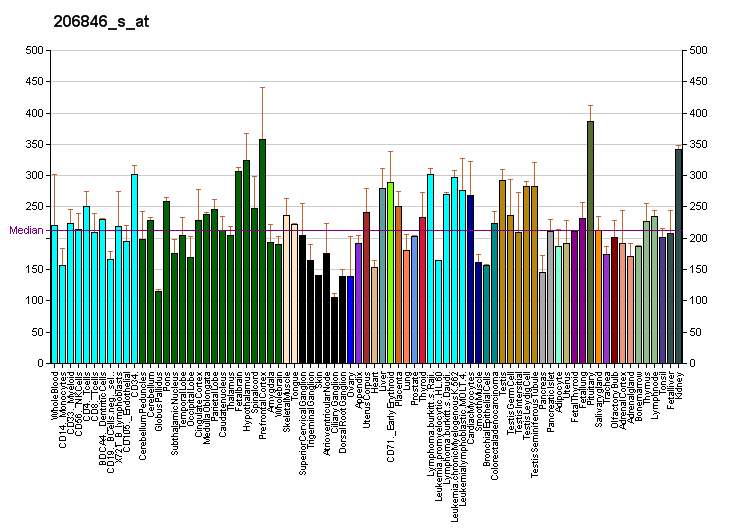

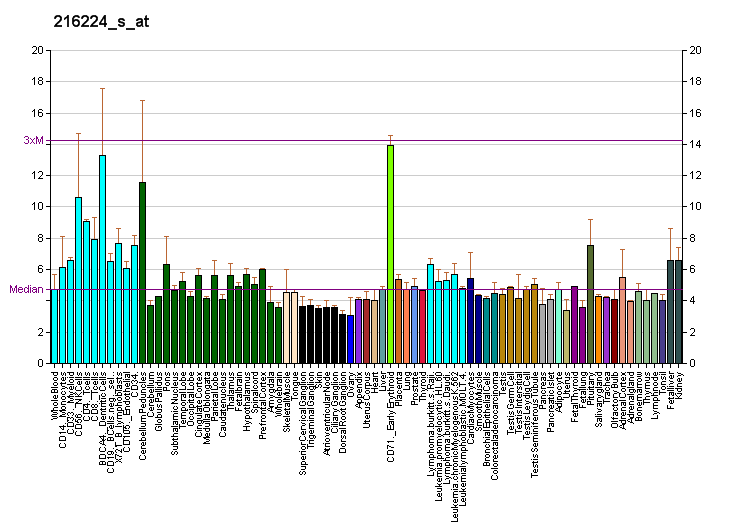
RNA expression pattern
Bgee	Human / Mouse (ortholog); Top expressed in: right hemisphere of cerebellum; anterior pituitary; right lobe of liver; right testis; left testis; body of uterus; right ovary; left ovary; ventricular zone; ganglionic eminence / Top expressed in: entorhinal cortex; perirhinal cortex; islet of Langerhans; yolk sac; central gray substance of midbrain; CA3 field; epiblast; medullary collecting duct; dorsomedial hypothalamic nucleus; choroid plexus of fourth ventricle; More reference expression data
BioGPS	More reference expression data
Gene ontology
Molecular function	histone deacetylase binding; misfolded protein binding; metal ion binding; enzyme binding; NAD-dependent histone deacetylase activity (H3-K14 specific); beta-catenin binding; zinc ion binding; polyubiquitin modification-dependent protein binding; protein binding; tau protein binding; dynein complex binding; Hsp90 protein binding; histone deacetylase activity; microtubule binding; alpha-tubulin binding; ubiquitin binding; beta-tubulin binding; actin binding; hydrolase activity; ubiquitin protein ligase binding; tubulin deacetylase activity; RNA polymerase II cis-regulatory region sequence-specific DNA binding; protein deacetylase activity; acetylspermidine deacetylase activity
Cellular component	cytosol; perinuclear region of cytoplasm; caveola; microtubule; nucleus; multivesicular body; cell projection; microtubule associated complex; aggresome; dynein complex; histone deacetylase complex; perikaryon; axon; inclusion body; dendrite; cell leading edge; cytoplasmic microtubule; cell body; neuron projection; nucleoplasm; cytoplasm; protein-containing complex
Biological process	Hsp90 deacetylation; protein quality control for misfolded or incompletely synthesized proteins; response to organic substance; cellular response to topologically incorrect protein; tubulin deacetylation; regulation of establishment of protein localization; ubiquitin-dependent protein catabolic process via the multivesicular body sorting pathway; response to growth factor; intracellular protein transport; aggresome assembly; negative regulation of proteolysis; histone H3 deacetylation; positive regulation of signal transduction; peptidyl-lysine deacetylation; response to misfolded protein; regulation of transcription, DNA-templated; regulation of protein stability; ubiquitin-dependent protein catabolic process; mitochondrion localization; positive regulation of epithelial cell migration; regulation of fat cell differentiation; transcription, DNA-templated; regulation of autophagy of mitochondrion; polyubiquitinated misfolded protein transport; response to toxic substance; positive regulation of hydrogen peroxide-mediated programmed cell death; regulation of microtubule-based movement; regulation of signaling receptor activity; protein polyubiquitination; protein deacetylation; negative regulation of hydrogen peroxide metabolic process; regulation of autophagy; negative regulation of oxidoreductase activity; regulation of androgen receptor signaling pathway; negative regulation of transcription, DNA-templated; cellular response to misfolded protein; positive regulation of chaperone-mediated protein complex assembly; regulation of gene expression, epigenetic; negative regulation of protein-containing complex disassembly; autophagy; negative regulation of microtubule depolymerization; lysosome localization; histone deacetylation; cellular response to hydrogen peroxide; collateral sprouting; dendritic spine morphogenesis; cilium assembly; regulation of macroautophagy; parkin-mediated stimulation of mitophagy in response to mitochondrial depolarization; positive regulation of mitophagy in response to mitochondrial depolarization; chromatin organization; positive regulation of protein oligomerization; protein-containing complex disassembly; positive regulation of peptidyl-serine phosphorylation; polyamine deacetylation; spermidine deacetylation
Sources:Amigo / QuickGO
Orthologs
Databases	NCBI: entry; OMA: entry
Species	Human	Mouse
Entrez	10013	15185
Ensembl	ENSG00000094631	ENSMUSG00000031161
UniProt	Q9UBN7	Q9Z2V5
RefSeq (mRNA)	NM_006044; NM_001321225; NM_001321226; NM_001321227; NM_001321228 NM_001321229; NM_001321230; NM_001321231	NM_001130416; NM_010413
RefSeq (protein)	NP_001308154; NP_001308155; NP_001308156; NP_001308157; NP_001308158 NP_001308159; NP_001308160; NP_006035	NP_001123888; NP_034543
Location (UCSC)	Chr X: 48.8 – 48.82 Mb	Chr X: 7.8 – 7.81 Mb
PubMed search
- Wikidata
View/Edit Human	View/Edit Mouse

Histone deacetylase 6 is an enzyme that in humans is encoded by the HDAC6 gene. HDAC6 has emerged as a highly promising candidate to selectively inhibit as a therapeutic strategy to combat several types of cancer and neurodegenerative disorders.

== Function ==
Histones play a critical role in transcriptional regulation, cell cycle progression, and developmental events. Histone acetylation/deacetylation alters chromatin structure and affects transcription. The protein encoded by this gene belongs to class II of the histone deacetylase/acuc/apha family. It contains an internal duplication of two catalytic domains that appear to function independently of each other. This protein possesses histone deacetylase activity and represses transcription.

It retracts the cilium of the cell, which is necessary prior to mitosis.

HDAC encourages cell motility and catalyzes α-tubulin deacetylation. As a result, the enzyme encourages cancer cell metastasis.

HDAC6 affects transcription and translation by regulating heat-shock protein 90 (Hsp90).

HDAC6 is required in the formation of stress granule (SG) proteins and is instrumental in SG formation; pharmacological inhibition or genetic removal of HDAC6 abolished SG formation.

HDAC6 bonds with high affinity to ubiquitinated proteins.

HDAC6 is involved in leptin sensitivity.

HDAC6 deacetylates threonine residue T178 on TAK1.

== Clinical relevance ==
Mutations in this gene have been associated to Alzheimer's disease.

Over expression of this protein correlates with tumorigenesis and cell survival. HDAC6 also encourages metastasis of cancer cells.

Since HDAC6 is dysregulated and/or implicated in several cancers and neurodegenerative disorders, pharmacological inhibition of this specific enzyme holds great therapeutic potential and could also limit side effects associated with pan-inhibitors of multiple HDAC enzymes. Selective inhibition of HDAC6 as a strategy to treat cancers is however also subject of debate, since some HDAC6 inhibitors exhibited anti-tumor activity in vitro and in vivo only when administered in high concentrations, which also produced off-target effects. The findings suggest that further study is needed to clarify data on anti-cancer effects of selective HDAC6 inhibitors.

== Interactions ==
HDAC6 has been shown to interact with HDAC11 and Zinc finger and BTB domain-containing protein 16.

HDAC6 interacts with SG (Stress granule) protein G3BP1.

== See also ==
- Histone deacetylase
