= HDAC10 =

Protein-coding gene in the species Homo sapiens

Identifiers
- Aliases: HDAC10, HD10, histone deacetylase 10
- External IDs: OMIM: 608544; MGI: 2158340; GeneCards: HDAC10
Enzyme activity
EC #	BRENDA	ExPASy	KEGG	MetaCyc
3.5.1.48	↗	↗	↗	↗
3.5.1.62	↗	↗	↗	↗

Gene location (Human)
Chr.	Chromosome 22 (human)
Band	22q13.33	Start	50,245,183 bp
Band	22q13.33	End	50,251,405 bp

Gene location (Mouse)
Chr.	Chromosome 15 (mouse)
Band	15|15 E3	Start	89,007,510 bp
Band	15|15 E3	End	89,012,903 bp
RNA expression pattern
Bgee	Human / Mouse (ortholog); Top expressed in: granulocyte; right uterine tube; right hemisphere of cerebellum; anterior pituitary; mucosa of transverse colon; spleen; right ovary; canal of the cervix; right frontal lobe; left ovary / Top expressed in: granulocyte; right kidney; muscle of thigh; esophagus; lip; proximal tubule; neural layer of retina; lacrimal gland; mesenteric lymph nodes; neural tube; More reference expression data
BioGPS	n/a
Gene ontology
Molecular function	NAD-dependent histone deacetylase activity (H3-K14 specific); protein deacetylase activity; histone deacetylase binding; protein binding; enzyme binding; hydrolase activity; histone deacetylase activity; zinc ion binding; deacetylase activity; acetylputrescine deacetylase activity; acetylspermidine deacetylase activity; metal ion binding
Cellular component	cytoplasm; histone deacetylase complex; nucleoplasm; nucleus
Biological process	histone H3 deacetylation; regulation of transcription, DNA-templated; negative regulation of transcription by RNA polymerase II; transcription, DNA-templated; protein deacetylation; oligodendrocyte development; negative regulation of transcription, DNA-templated; histone deacetylation; chromatin organization; macroautophagy; positive regulation of mismatch repair; peptidyl-lysine deacetylation; homologous recombination; polyamine deacetylation; spermidine deacetylation; DNA repair; DNA recombination; autophagy; cellular response to DNA damage stimulus
Sources:Amigo / QuickGO
Orthologs
Databases	NCBI: entry; OMA: entry
Species	Human	Mouse
Entrez	83933	170787
Ensembl	ENSG00000100429	ENSMUSG00000062906
UniProt	Q969S8; Q08AP5	Q6P3E7
RefSeq (mRNA)	NM_032019; NM_001159286	NM_199198
RefSeq (protein)	NP_001152758; NP_114408	NP_954668
Location (UCSC)	Chr 22: 50.25 – 50.25 Mb	Chr 15: 89.01 – 89.01 Mb
PubMed search
- Wikidata
View/Edit Human	View/Edit Mouse

Histone deacetylase 10 is an enzyme that in humans is encoded by the HDAC10 gene. HDAC10 is a class IIb HDAC. It specifically has selectivity for long, slender polyamines like N8-acetylspermidine.

Acetylation of histone core particles modulates chromatin structure and gene expression. The opposing enzymatic activities of histone acetyltransferases and histone deacetylases, such as HDAC10, determine the acetylation status of histone tails (Kao et al., 2002).[supplied by OMIM]

== Interactions ==
HDAC10 has been shown to interact with Histone deacetylase 2 and Nuclear receptor co-repressor 2.

== See also ==
- Histone deacetylase
