= HDAC8 =

Protein-coding gene in the species Homo sapiens

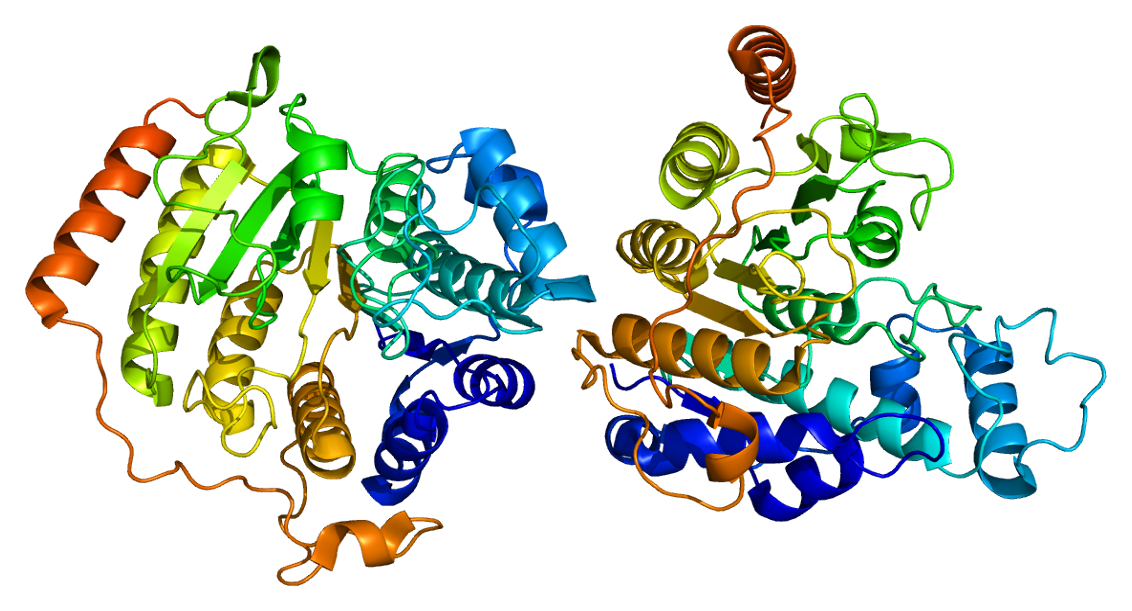

Identifiers
- Aliases: HDAC8, CDLS5, HD8, HDACL1, MRXS6, RPD3, WTS, CDA07, histone deacetylase 8, KDAC8
- External IDs: OMIM: 300269; MGI: 1917565; GeneCards: HDAC8
Available structures
PDB	Ortholog search: PDBe RCSB
PDB	List of PDB id codes 1T64, 1T67, 1T69, 1VKG, 1W22, 2V5W, 2V5X, 3EW8, 3EWF, 3EZP, 3EZT, 3F06, 3F07, 3F0R, 3MZ3, 3MZ4, 3MZ6, 3MZ7, 3RQD, 3SFF, 3SFH, 4QA0, 4QA1, 4QA2, 4QA3, 4QA4, 4QA5, 4QA6, 4QA7, 4RN0, 4RN1, 4RN2, 5DC7, 5D1D, 5D1C, 5DC8, 5D1B, 5DC5, 5DC6, 5BWZ
Enzyme activity
EC #	BRENDA	ExPASy	KEGG	MetaCyc
3.5.1.98	↗	↗	↗	↗

Gene location (Human)
Chr.	X chromosome (human)
Band	Xq13.1	Start	72,329,516 bp
Band	Xq13.1	End	72,573,101 bp

Gene location (Mouse)
Chr.	X chromosome (mouse)
Band	X|X D	Start	101,328,245 bp
Band	X|X D	End	101,548,965 bp
RNA expression pattern
Bgee	Human / Mouse (ortholog); Top expressed in: epithelium of colon; left adrenal gland; left adrenal cortex; right adrenal gland; tendon of biceps brachii; right adrenal cortex; gonad; Achilles tendon; cerebellar hemisphere; anterior pituitary / Top expressed in: wall of esophagus; mucosa of esophagus; epithelium of esophagus; ventricular zone; Rathke's pouch; dentate gyrus of hippocampal formation granule cell; lumbar subsegment of spinal cord; right kidney; zygote; embryo; More reference expression data
BioGPS	n/a
Gene ontology
Molecular function	Hsp90 protein binding; NAD-dependent histone deacetylase activity (H3-K14 specific); histone deacetylase activity; metal ion binding; Hsp70 protein binding; protein binding; hydrolase activity; chromatin binding; transcription factor binding; deacetylase activity
Cellular component	cytoplasm; histone deacetylase complex; cytosol; plasma membrane; nucleoplasm; nuclear chromosome; nucleus
Biological process	histone H3 deacetylation; regulation of transcription, DNA-templated; regulation of protein stability; regulation of telomere maintenance; negative regulation of transcription by RNA polymerase II; transcription, DNA-templated; sister chromatid cohesion; regulation of cohesin loading; negative regulation of protein ubiquitination; histone deacetylation; negative regulation of gene expression; cellular response to trichostatin A; negative regulation of osteoblast differentiation; cellular response to forskolin; negative regulation of histone H3-K9 acetylation; chromatin organization; positive regulation of transcription by RNA polymerase II; histone H4 deacetylation
Sources:Amigo / QuickGO
Orthologs
Databases	NCBI: entry; OMA: entry
Species	Human	Mouse
Entrez	55869	70315
Ensembl	ENSG00000147099	ENSMUSG00000067567
UniProt	Q9BY41	Q8VH37
RefSeq (mRNA)	NM_001166418; NM_001166419; NM_001166420; NM_001166422; NM_001166448 NM_018486	NM_027382; NM_001313742
RefSeq (protein)	NP_001159890; NP_001159891; NP_001159892; NP_001159894; NP_001159920 NP_060956	NP_001300671; NP_081658
Location (UCSC)	Chr X: 72.33 – 72.57 Mb	Chr X: 101.33 – 101.55 Mb
PubMed search
- Wikidata
View/Edit Human	View/Edit Mouse

Histone deacetylase 8 is an enzyme that in humans is encoded by the HDAC8 gene.

== Function ==
Histones play a critical role in transcriptional regulation, cell cycle progression, and developmental events. Histone acetylation / deacetylation alters chromosome structure and affects transcription factor access to DNA. The protein encoded by this gene belongs to class I of the histone deacetylase/acuc/apha family. It has histone deacetylase activity and represses transcription when tethered to a promoter.

Histone deacetylase 8 is involved in skull morphogenesis and metabolic control of the ERR-alpha / PGC1-alpha transcriptional complex.

== Clinical significance ==
HDAC8 has been linked to number of disease states notably to acute myeloid leukemia and is related to actin cytoskeleton in smooth muscle cells. siRNA targeting HDAC8 showed anticancer effects. Inhibition of HDAC8 induced apoptosis has been observed in T cell lymphomas. In addition the HDAC8 enzyme has been implicated in the pathogenesis of neuroblastoma. Therefore, there has been interest in developing HDAC8 selective inhibitors. At least 20 disease-causing mutations in this gene have been discovered.

== Interactions ==
- ERR-alpha.

== See also ==
- Histone deacetylase
