= HDAC3 =

Protein-coding gene in humans

Identifiers
- Aliases: HDAC3, HD3, RPD3, RPD3-2, histone deacetylase 3
- External IDs: OMIM: 605166; MGI: 1343091; GeneCards: HDAC3
Available structures
PDB	Ortholog search: PDBe RCSB
PDB	List of PDB id codes 4A69
Enzyme activity
EC #	BRENDA	ExPASy	KEGG	MetaCyc
3.5.1.98	↗	↗	↗	↗

Gene location (Human)
Chr.	Chromosome 5 (human)
Band	n/a	Start	141,620,876 bp
Band	n/a	End	141,636,870 bp

Gene location (Mouse)
Chr.	Chromosome 18 (mouse)
Band	18 19.81 cM|18 B3	Start	38,068,897 bp
Band	18 19.81 cM|18 B3	End	38,088,069 bp
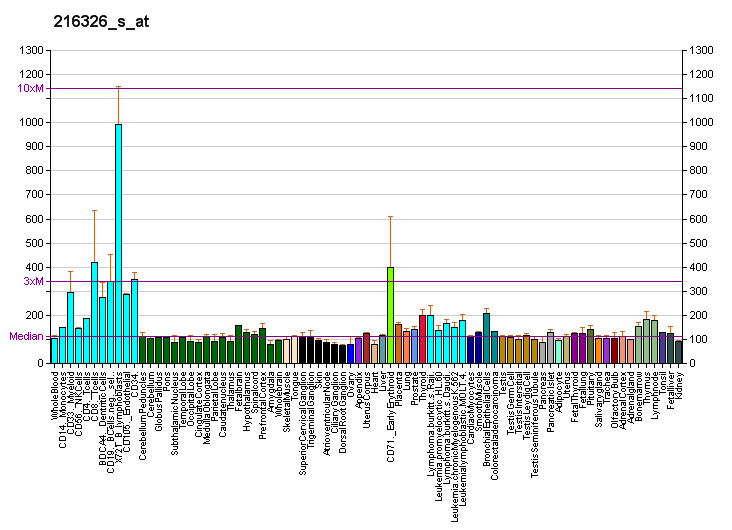
RNA expression pattern
Bgee	Human / Mouse (ortholog); Top expressed in: right hemisphere of cerebellum; right adrenal cortex; left adrenal gland; left adrenal cortex; skin of leg; granulocyte; skin of abdomen; anterior pituitary; right ovary; right lobe of thyroid gland / Top expressed in: spermatocyte; ventricular zone; genital tubercle; tail of embryo; superior frontal gyrus; muscle of thigh; lip; yolk sac; primary visual cortex; neural tube; More reference expression data
BioGPS	More reference expression data
Gene ontology
Molecular function	NAD-dependent histone deacetylase activity (H3-K14 specific); transcription corepressor activity; histone deacetylase activity; protein deacetylase activity; transcription factor binding; histone deacetylase binding; chromatin binding; NF-kappaB binding; protein binding; enzyme binding; hydrolase activity; cyclin binding
Cellular component	cytoplasm; histone deacetylase complex; cytosol; Golgi apparatus; plasma membrane; transcription repressor complex; nucleoplasm; spindle microtubule; nucleus; mitotic spindle
Biological process	histone H3 deacetylation; positive regulation of protein phosphorylation; regulation of transcription, DNA-templated; regulation of protein stability; negative regulation of apoptotic process; negative regulation of transcription by RNA polymerase II; cellular response to fluid shear stress; transcription, DNA-templated; spindle assembly; protein deacetylation; negative regulation of JNK cascade; circadian rhythm; negative regulation of myotube differentiation; negative regulation of transcription, DNA-templated; histone deacetylation; positive regulation of TOR signaling; positive regulation of transcription by RNA polymerase II; negative regulation of nucleic acid-templated transcription; regulation of lipid metabolic process; chromatin organization; positive regulation of protein import into nucleus; histone H4 deacetylation; positive regulation of cold-induced thermogenesis; positive regulation of protein ubiquitination; circadian regulation of gene expression; regulation of circadian rhythm; rhythmic process
Sources:Amigo / QuickGO
Orthologs
Databases	NCBI: entry; OMA: entry
Species	Human	Mouse
Entrez	8841	15183
Ensembl	ENSG00000171720	ENSMUSG00000024454
UniProt	O15379	O88895
RefSeq (mRNA)	NM_003883	NM_010411
RefSeq (protein)	NP_003874; NP_001341968; NP_001341969; NP_001341970	NP_034541
Location (UCSC)	Chr 5: 141.62 – 141.64 Mb	Chr 18: 38.07 – 38.09 Mb
PubMed search
- Wikidata
View/Edit Human	View/Edit Mouse

Histone deacetylase 3 is an enzyme encoded by the HDAC3 gene in both humans and mice.

== Function ==
Histones are alkaline positively charged proteins that package and organize DNA into structural units known as nucleosomes, the primary protein component of chromatin. Posttranslational, enzyme-mediated lysine acetylation and deacetylation of histone tails modify local chromatin structure by altering the electrostatic interaction between the negatively charged DNA backbone and the histones. HDAC3 is a Class I member of the histone deacetylase superfamily, which is divided into four classes based on function and sequence homology. HDAC3 is recruited to enhancers, where it modulates the epigenome and regulates nearby gene expression. It is found exclusively in the cell nucleus, and is the only endogenous histone deacetylase biochemically purified as part of the nuclear receptor corepressor complex containing NCOR and SMRT (NCOR2). Unlike other HDACs, HDAC3 therefore plays a distinct role in regulating the transcriptional activity of nuclear receptors.

== Role in intestinal homeostasis ==
Histone deacetylases can be regulated by endogenous factors, dietary components, synthetic inhibitors, and bacteria-derived signals. Studies in mice with a specific deletion of HDAC3 in intestinal epithelial cells (IECs) have shown deregulated gene expression in IECs. In these deletion-mutant mice, the loss of Paneth cells, impaired IEC function, and changes in the intestinal composition of commensal bacteria were observed. These adverse effects did not occur in germ-free mice, indicating that they depend on intestinal microbial colonization. However, they are not caused by the presence of an altered microbiota, since normal germ-free mice colonized with the mutant-associated microbiota did not develop the same defects.

Although the precise mechanisms and signals remain unclear, HDAC3 is known to interact with commensal bacteria–derived signals from the gut microbiota. These interactions calibrate epithelial cell responses that are essential for establishing a balanced relationship between the host and its commensal microbes and for maintaining intestinal homeostasis.

== Inhibitors ==
RGFP966 is a highly selective HDAC3 inhibitor which is widely used in scientific research.

The HDAC3 inhibitor imofinostat is being developed for the treatment of colorectal cancer.

== Interactions ==
HDAC3 has been shown to interact with:

- CBFA2T3,
- CCND1,
- GATA1,
- GATA2,
- GPS2,
- GTF2I,
- HDAC4,
- HDAC5,
- HDAC7A,
- HDAC9,
- MAP3K7IP2,
- MAPK11,
- NCOR1,
- NCOR2,
- PPARD,
- PPARG,
- PML
- RBBP4,
- RELA,
- RP,
- RUNX2,
- SUV39H1,
- TCP1,
- TBL1X,
- TR2,
- UBC,
- YY1, and
- ZBTB33.

== See also ==
- Histone deacetylase
