= HDAC11 =

Protein-coding gene in the species Homo sapiens

Identifiers
- Aliases: HDAC11, HD11, histone deacetylase 11
- External IDs: OMIM: 607226; MGI: 2385252; GeneCards: HDAC11
Enzyme activity
EC #	BRENDA	ExPASy	KEGG	MetaCyc
3.5.1.98	↗	↗	↗	↗

Gene location (Human)
Chr.	Chromosome 3 (human)
Band	3p25.1	Start	13,479,724 bp
Band	3p25.1	End	13,506,424 bp

Gene location (Mouse)
Chr.	Chromosome 6 (mouse)
Band	6|6 D1	Start	91,133,647 bp
Band	6|6 D1	End	91,151,674 bp
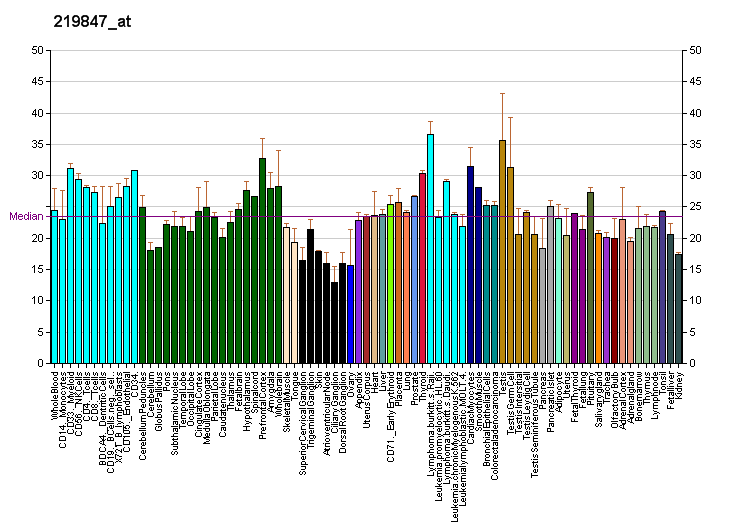
RNA expression pattern
Bgee	Human / Mouse (ortholog); Top expressed in: left testis; inferior ganglion of vagus nerve; right testis; putamen; amygdala; caudate nucleus; C1 segment; nucleus accumbens; prefrontal cortex; globus pallidus / Top expressed in: dorsomedial hypothalamic nucleus; superior colliculus; dorsal tegmental nucleus; ventral tegmental area; lateral hypothalamus; paraventricular nucleus of hypothalamus; anterior amygdaloid area; ventromedial nucleus; central gray substance of midbrain; Region I of hippocampus proper; More reference expression data
BioGPS	More reference expression data
Gene ontology
Molecular function	NAD-dependent histone deacetylase activity (H3-K14 specific); transcription factor binding; hydrolase activity; histone deacetylase activity; protein binding
Cellular component	histone deacetylase complex; plasma membrane; nucleus
Biological process	histone H3 deacetylation; oligodendrocyte development; regulation of transcription, DNA-templated; histone deacetylation; transcription, DNA-templated; chromatin organization
Sources:Amigo / QuickGO
Orthologs
Databases	NCBI: entry; OMA: entry
Species	Human	Mouse
Entrez	79885	232232
Ensembl	ENSG00000163517	ENSMUSG00000034245
UniProt	Q96DB2	Q91WA3
RefSeq (mRNA)	NM_001136041; NM_024827; NM_001330636	NM_144919
RefSeq (protein)	NP_001129513; NP_001317565; NP_079103	NP_659168
Location (UCSC)	Chr 3: 13.48 – 13.51 Mb	Chr 6: 91.13 – 91.15 Mb
PubMed search
- Wikidata
View/Edit Human	View/Edit Mouse

Histone deacetylase 11 is a 39kDa histone deacetylase enzyme that in humans is encoded by the HDAC11 gene on chromosome 3 in humans and chromosome 6 in mice.

It is the only Class IV HDAC since it is not highly homologous with either Rpd3 or hda1 yeast enzymes and so does not fit into either Class I or Class II. It is the smallest HDAC isoform and it was first described in 2002.

== Function ==
Histone deacetylases, such as HDAC11, control DNA expression by modifying the core histone octamers that package DNA into dense chromatin structures and repress gene expression.[supplied by OMIM]

HDAC11 expression is normally found in brain and testis tissue, but upregulation of HDAC11 expression has also been seen in various cancer cells.

HDAC11 has been shown to be a negative regulator of IL-10 production in antigen presenting cells. It has also been shown that inhibition of HDAC11 results in increased expression of OX40L in Hodgkin lymphoma cells.

== Interactions ==
HDAC11 has been shown to interact with HDAC6.

== See also ==
- Histone deacetylase
