= MADS-box =

Protein family

The MADS box is a conserved sequence motif. The genes which contain this motif are called the MADS-box gene family. The MADS box encodes the DNA-binding MADS domain. The MADS domain binds to DNA sequences of high similarity to the motif CC[A/T]_{6}GG termed the CArG-box. MADS-domain proteins are generally transcription factors. The length of the MADS-box reported by various researchers varies somewhat, but typical lengths are in the range of 168 to 180 base pairs, i.e. the encoded MADS domain has a length of 56 to 60 amino acids. There is evidence that the MADS domain evolved from a sequence stretch of a type II topoisomerase in a common ancestor of all extant eukaryotes.

== Origin of name and history of research ==
The first MADS-box gene to be identified was ARG80 from budding yeast, Saccharomyces cerevisiae, but was at that time not recognized as a member of a large gene family. The MADS-box gene family got its name later as an acronym referring to the four founding members, ignoring ARG80:

- MCM1 from the budding yeast, Saccharomyces cerevisiae,
- AGAMOUS from the thale cress Arabidopsis thaliana,
- DEFICIENS from the snapdragon Antirrhinum majus,
- SRF from the human Homo sapiens.

In A. thaliana, A. majus, and Zea mays this motif is involved in floral development. Early study in these model angiosperms was the beginning of research into the molecular evolution of floral structure in general, as well as their role in nonflowering plants.

== Diversity ==
MADS-box genes have been detected in nearly all eukaryotes studied. While the genomes of animals and fungi generally possess only around one to five MADS-box genes, genomes of flowering plants have around 100 MADS-box genes. Two types of MADS-domain proteins are distinguished; the SRF-like or Type I MADS-domain proteins and the MEF2-like (after MYOCYTE-ENHANCER-FACTOR2) or Type II MADS-domain proteins. SRF-like MADS-domain proteins in animals and fungi have a second conserved domain, the SAM (SRF, ARG80, MCM1) domain. MEF2-like MADS-domain proteins in animals and fungi have the MEF2 domain as a second conserved domain. In plants, the MEF2-like MADS-domain proteins are also termed MIKC-type proteins referring to their conserved domain structure, where the MADS (M) domain is followed by an Intervening (I), a Keratin-like (K) and a C-terminal domain. In plants, MADS-domain protein form tetramers and this is thought to be central for their function. The structure of the tetramerisation domain of the MADS-domain protein SEPALLATA3 was solved illustrating the structural basis for tetramer formation

In Zea mays the mutant Tunicate1 produces pod corn. Tunicate1 is a mutant of Z. mays MADS19 (ZMM19), in the SHORT VEGETATIVE PHASE gene family. ZMM19 can be ectopically expressed.

Such ectopic expression of ZMM19 in A. thaliana enlarges sepals, suggesting conservation.

== Function of MADS-box genes ==
MADS-box genes have a variety of functions. In animals, MADS-box genes are involved in muscle development and cell proliferation and differentiation. Functions in fungi range from pheromone response to arginine metabolism.

In plants, MADS-box genes are involved in controlling all major aspects of development, including male and female gametophyte development, embryo and seed development, as well as root, flower and fruit development.

Some MADS-box genes of flowering plants have homeotic functions like the HOX genes of animals. The floral homeotic MADS-box genes (such as AGAMOUS and DEFICIENS) participate in the determination of floral organ identity according to the ABC model of flower development.

Another function of MADS-box genes is flowering time determination. In Arabidopsis thaliana the MADS box genes SOC1 and Flowering Locus C (FLC) have been shown to have an important role in the integration of molecular flowering time pathways. These genes are essential for the correct timing of flowering, and help to ensure that fertilization occurs at the time of maximal reproductive potential.

== Structure of MADS-box proteins ==
The MADS box protein structure is characterized by four domains. At the N terminal end is the highly conserved MADS DNA binding domain. Next to the MADS domain is the moderately conserved Intervening (I) and Keratin-like (K) domains, which are involved in specific protein-protein interactions. The carboxyl terminal (C) domain is highly variable and is involved in transcriptional activation and assemblage of heterodimers and multimeric protein complexes.

== Human genes ==
- Mef2 family:
  - MEF2A, MEF2B, MEF2C, MEF2D
- SRF
