= C1orf21 =

Protein-coding gene in humans

Identifiers
- Aliases: C1orf21, PIG13, chromosome 1 open reading frame 21
- External IDs: MGI: 1916649; GeneCards: C1orf21

Gene location (Human)
Chr.	Chromosome 1 (human)
Band	1q25.3	Start	184,387,029 bp
Band	1q25.3	End	184,629,019 bp

Gene location (Mouse)
Chr.	Chromosome 1 (mouse)
Band	1|1 G2	Start	151,728,154 bp
Band	1|1 G2	End	151,965,876 bp
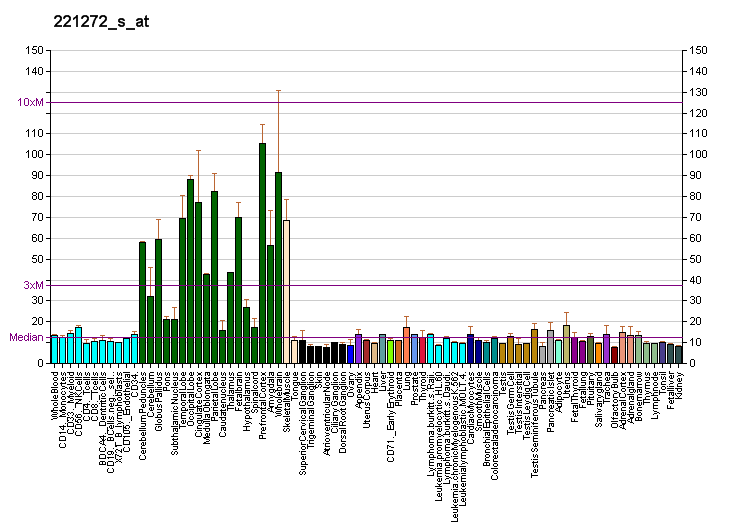
RNA expression pattern
Bgee	Human / Mouse (ortholog); Top expressed in: Achilles tendon; gastrocnemius muscle; muscle of thigh; skin of abdomen; ectocervix; rectum; skin of leg; vagina; tibia; Skeletal muscle tissue of rectus abdominis / Top expressed in: genital tubercle; tail of embryo; otolith organ; utricle; transitional epithelium of urinary bladder; ankle; triceps brachii muscle; vastus lateralis muscle; soleus muscle; muscle of thigh; More reference expression data
BioGPS	More reference expression data
Orthologs
Databases	NCBI: entry; OMA: entry
Species	Human	Mouse
Entrez	81563	69399
Ensembl	ENSG00000116667	ENSMUSG00000032666
UniProt	Q9H246	Q8K207
RefSeq (mRNA)	NM_030806	NM_197990
RefSeq (protein)	NP_110433	NP_932107
Location (UCSC)	Chr 1: 184.39 – 184.63 Mb	Chr 1: 151.73 – 151.97 Mb
PubMed search
- Wikidata
View/Edit Human	View/Edit Mouse

Uncharacterized protein C1orf21, also known as Proliferation-Inducing Protein 13, is a protein that in humans is encoded by the C1orf21 gene. C1orf21 is an intracellular protein that flows between the nucleus and the cytoplasm in the cell. It has been linked with cell growth and reproduction and there has been strong links with various types of cancers. There are no paralogs for this gene, however, many conserved orthologs have been found in all invertebrates. C1orf21 has low to moderate level of expression in most tissues in humans, however, it has the most expression in the skin, lung and prostate.

== Gene ==
=== Locus ===
C1orf198 is a protein-encoding gene found on the reverse strand of chromosome 1 at the locus 1q25.3.

=== Gene neighborhood ===
C1orf21 is located on the long arm of chromosome 1. It is found at position 5q23.1.

Cytogenic band: 1q25.3

=== Size ===
Chromosome one is one of the longest chromosomes, in which C1orf21 spans from 184,385,826 to 184,390,390 bases, resulting with mRNA transcript that is 10,278 nucleotides long with 4 exons. The protein is 121 amino acids long, containing a domain of unknown function known as DUF4612.

=== Expression ===
NCBI gene and RNA-Seq revealed that C1orf21 is expressed in all tissues at a low to moderate level, however, it is mostly expressed in the skin, brain and prostate.

== Gene level regulation ==
=== Promoter ===
There was over 7 promoters that were predicted, but the true promoter was 1111 base pairs long known as .

=== Transcription factor binding sites ===
Many transcription factor (TF) binding sites have been predicted through Genomatix. Some important binding cites include MYRE, MARs, and Bright.

MYRE is a myelin regulatory factor. Myelin is produced in the central nervous system and plays a large role in axons. MARs is a special AT-rich sequence-binding protein 1, predominantly expressed in thymocytes, binds to matrix attachment regions. Bright helps with B cell regulator of IgH transcription.

== Protein ==
=== Subcellular location ===
It was predicted that the location of C1orf21 is in the nucleus with 62.2% certainty. The mitochondria was predicted at 17.4%: mitochondrial, while the cytoskeleton, and vascular system at 4.3%.

=== Structure ===
C1orf21 protein is 121 amino acids long with a molecular weight of 18,7 kDa with an isoelectric point of 5.08. It is believed that the protein interacts with the nuclear membrane and contains an unknown domain known as DUF4612. For the secondary and tertiary structure it is predicted that there are many alpha helices in the structure, with the rest of the protein having a disordered structure.

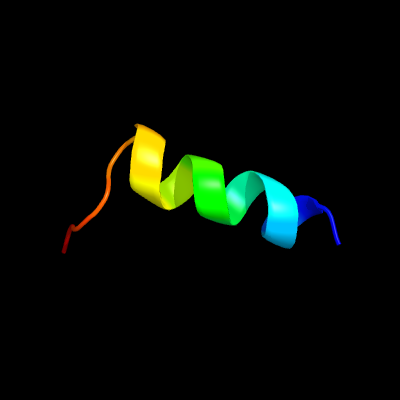
PHYRE. An α-helix from 18 amino acids of C1orf21.

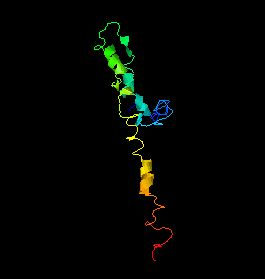
I-TASSER software generated a prediction of the tertiary structure of C1orf21

== Protein level regulation ==
- O-glycosylation sites: Serine 5, Threonine 11, Serine 66, Serine 68, and Serine 69.
- Palmitioyaltion site: Cysteine 3
- Phosphorylation: Serine 34, Serine 44, Serine 66, Serine 69, Serine 75, Serine 95, Serine 115, Serine 121
- Sumoylation site: Lysine 46 and Lysine 106
- Tyrosine sulfation site: Tyrosine 113

== Interacting proteins ==
=== Protein ===	=== Function ===
Calcineurin-binding protein cabin-1 (Cabin1)	Required for replication-independent chromatin assembly
Centrosomal protein of 162 kDa (CEP162)	Required to promote assembly of the transition zone in primary cilia.
CD97 antigen	Receptor potentially involved in both adhesion and signaling processes early after leukocyte activation.
Chromosome 11 open reading frame 57 (C11orf57)	Unknown
Chromosome 5 open reading frame 51 (C5orf51)	Unknown
Homeobox protein Nkx-2.8; (NKX2-8)	NKL subclass homeoboxes and pseudogenes
NACHT, LRR and PYD domains-containing protein 13 (NLPR13)	Involved in inflammation
Semaphorin-3C (SEMA3C)	Binds to plexin family members and plays an important role in the regulation of developmental processes
Zinc finger protein 19 (ZNF19)	transcriptional regulation

== Homology ==
=== Paralogs ===
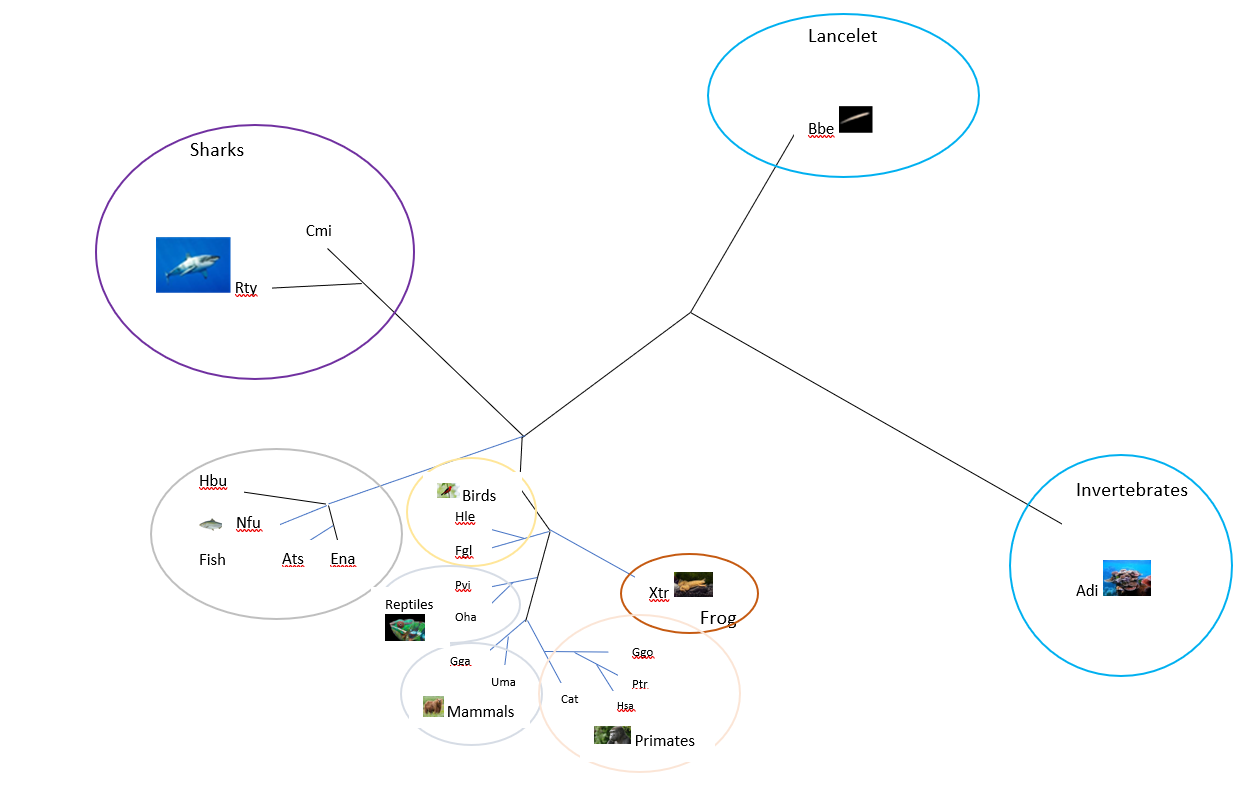
Figure 3. Unrooted phylogenetic tree of C1orf21 orthologs. Adi [Acropora digitifera, Stony coral pulp], Ate [Anabas testudineus], Bbe [Branchiostoma belcheri, crown-of-thorns starfish], Cat [Cercocebus atys], Cmi [Callorhinchus milli], Ena [Echeneis naucrates], Fgl [Fulmarus glacialis], Gga [Gallus gallus, chicken], Ggg [Gorilla gorilla gorilla], Hbu [Haplochromis burtoni], Hle [Haliaeetus leucocephalus], Has [Homo sapiens, human], Mul [Macaca mulatta], Nfu [Nothobranchius furzeri], Oha [Ophiophagus hannah], Ptr [Pan troglodytes], Pvi [Pogona vitticeps, central bearded dragon], Rty [Rhincodon typus], Xla [Xenopus laevis, African clawed frog] Uma [Ursus maritimus]. Tree made with a neighbor-Joining method using a ClustalW-formatted set of sequences as input1.1 Clustal W

There are no isoforms or paralogs of C1orf21 that are known.

=== Orthologs ===
C1orf21 is found in most classes of vertebrates and some invertebrates. The most distant ortholog of C1orf21 is Acropora digitifera, which diverged an estimated 824 million years ago. There is no traces of the C1orf21 gene in organisms that are traced beyond invertebrates, such as fungi, plants, protists, or single celled organisms.

=== Homologous domains ===
The domain of unknown function 4612 (DUF4612) was highly conserved in most orthologs.

Species	Common name	Taxonomic group	DOD (MYA)	Accession number	Sequence length (aa)	Identity	Similarity
Homo sapiens	Human	Primates	0	NP_110433	121	100	100
Pan troglodytes	Chimpanzee	Primates	7	NP_001229539	121	100	100
Gorilla gorilla gorilla	Gorilla	Primates	9	XP_018883443	121	100	100
Macaca mulatta	Rhesus macaque	Primates	30	NP_001247792	121	100	100
Cercocebus atys	Sooty mangabey	Primates	30	XP_011903171	121	100	100
Ursus maritimus	Polar bear	Carnivora	96	XP_008695366	121	97	99
Pogona vitticeps	Central bearded dragon	Amphioxiformes	312	XP_020650764	121	94	97
Gallus gallus	Red junglefowl	Galliformes	312	XP_422292	121	93	98
Haliaeetus leucocephalus	Bald eagle	Accipitriformes	312	XP_010578992	121	93	98
Fulmarus glacialis	Northern fulmar	Procellariiformes	312	KFV96345	90	93	98
Ophiophagus hannah	King cobra	Squamata	312	ETE66728	121	91	96
Xenopus tropicalis	Western clawed frog	Anura	352	NP_001072652	121	77	85
Nothobranchius furzeri	Turquoise killifish	Cyprinodontiformes	435	XP_015827000	116	61	73
Echeneis naucrates	Live sharksucker	Perciformes	435	XP_029355762	116	61	73
Haplochromis burtoni	Burton's mouthbrooder	Cichliformes	435	XP_005932528	116	61	73
Anabas testudineus	Blue perch	Anabantiformes	435	XP_026201702	116	47	60
Callorhinchus milii	Australian ghostshark	Chimaeriformes	473	XP_007893787	135	69	79
Rhincodon typus	Whale Shark	Orectolobiformes	473	XP_020373635	91	68	82
Branchiostoma belcheri	Belcher's lancelet	Amphioxiformes	684	XP_019640980	114	33	56
Acropora digitifera	Stony coral pulp	Scleractinia	824	XP_015747227	140	55	65

== Function ==
C1orf21 is most likely involved in the growth of cells, especially in the nucleus where replication of DNA occurs.

== Clinical significance ==
Even though there is not a lot known about C1orf21, there have been some links with diseases. In many studies it has been found that there are links with cancer. Since C1orf21 is associated with cell proliferation, in another study by Sooda et al. there was an interest in the transcript map of the HPC1 locus, to help them identify the susceptibility genes involved in prostate cancer and jaw tumor. It was seen that overall there are several studies where C1orf21 has been studied on role it plays in cancer for different body areas among many other genes. It was also found that there is a large correlation with affects on keratinocytes since C1orf21 plays a role in ZNF750 silencing.
