= MEF2B =

Protein-coding gene in humans

Identifiers
- Aliases: MEF2B, RSRFR2, myocyte enhancer factor 2B
- External IDs: OMIM: 600661; MGI: 104526; GeneCards: MEF2B
Available structures
PDB	Human UniProt search: PDBe RCSB
PDB	List of PDB id codes 1N6J, 1TQE

Gene location (Mouse)
Chr.	Chromosome 8 (mouse)
Band	8 B3.3|8 34.15 cM	Start	70,592,361 bp
Band	8 B3.3|8 34.15 cM	End	70,620,138 bp
RNA expression pattern
Bgee	Human / Mouse (ortholog); Top expressed in: lymph node; blood; spleen; appendix; canal of the cervix; right uterine tube; left uterine tube; thymus; skin of abdomen; right coronary artery / Top expressed in: urethra; male urethra; back muscles; respiratory epithelium; nasal epithelium; olfactory epithelium; primary oocyte; embryo; embryo; myotome; More reference expression data
BioGPS	n/a
Gene ontology
Molecular function	DNA-binding transcription factor activity; RNA polymerase II cis-regulatory region sequence-specific DNA binding; DNA binding; DNA-binding transcription activator activity, RNA polymerase II-specific; histone deacetylase binding; protein dimerization activity; RNA polymerase II transcription regulatory region sequence-specific DNA binding; DNA-binding transcription factor activity, RNA polymerase II-specific
Cellular component	nucleus; transcription regulator complex
Biological process	muscle organ development; regulation of transcription, DNA-templated; transcription, DNA-templated; transcription by RNA polymerase II; positive regulation of transcription by RNA polymerase II
Sources:Amigo / QuickGO
Orthologs
Databases	NCBI: entry
Species	Human	Mouse
Entrez	100271849	17259
Ensembl	n/a	ENSMUSG00000079033
UniProt	Q02080	n/a
RefSeq (mRNA)	NM_001145785; NM_001367282	NM_001045484; NM_008578
RefSeq (protein)	NP_001139257; NP_001354211	n/a
Location (UCSC)	n/a	Chr 8: 70.59 – 70.62 Mb
PubMed search
- Wikidata
View/Edit Human	View/Edit Mouse

Myocyte enhancer binding factor 2B (MEF2B) is a transcription factor part of the MEF2 gene family including MEF2A, MEF2C, and MEF2D. However, MEF2B is distant from the other three branches of MEF2 genes as it lacks the protein-coding Holliday junction recognition protein C-terminal (HJURP_C) region in vertebrates.

== Functions ==
The MEF2 gene family is expressed in muscle-specific gene activation and maintenance during development. MEF2B mRNA is present in skeletal, smooth, brain and heart muscles. MEF2B is directly involved in smooth muscle myosin heavy chain (SMHC) gene regulation. Overexpression of MEF2B will activate the SMHC promoter in smooth muscle when it is bound to the A/T-rich element of the promoter.

== Interactions ==
MEF2B has been shown to interact with CABIN1.

== Clinical relevance ==
Recurrent mutations in this gene have been associated with cases of diffuse large B-cell lymphoma. In its mutated form, MEF2B can lead to deregulation of the proto-oncogene BCL6 expression in diffuse large B-cell lymphomas (DLBCL). Mutations of MEF2B enhance its transcriptional activity due to either a disruption with its corepressor CABIN1 or causing the gene to become insensitive to inhibitory signaling events.

== See also ==
- Mef2
