= C9H9NO3 =

The molecular formula C_{9}H_{9}NO_{3} (molar mass: 179.175 g/mol) may refer to:

- Acedoben
- N-Acetylanthranilic acid
- Adrenochrome
- Adrenolutin
- Hippuric acid
