= BRD-6929 =

Clinical data
- Other names: BRD6929; "Compound 60"; Cpd-60; Cmpd60; Merck60; BRD-692; BRD692
- Drug class: Histone deacetylase inhibitor; HDAC1, HDAC2, and HDAC3 inhibitor
- ATC code: None

Identifiers
- IUPAC name: 4-acetamido-N-(2-amino-5-thiophen-2-ylphenyl)benzamide
- CAS Number: 849234-64-6
- PubChem CID: 6918878
- ChemSpider: 5294069
- ChEBI: CHEBI:95226
- ChEMBL: ChEMBL235842

Chemical and physical data
- Formula: C_{19}H_{17}N_{3}O_{2}S
- Molar mass: 351.42 g·mol^{−1}
- 3D model (JSmol): Interactive image
- SMILES: CC(=O)NC1=CC=C(C=C1)C(=O)NC2=C(C=CC(=C2)C3=CC=CS3)N
- InChI: InChI=1S/C19H17N3O2S/c1-12(23)21-15-7-4-13(5-8-15)19(24)22-17-11-14(6-9-16(17)20)18-3-2-10-25-18/h2-11H,20H2,1H3,(H,21,23)(H,22,24); Key:ABZSPJVXTTUFAA-UHFFFAOYSA-N

BRD-6929, also widely known as "compound 60" (Cpd-60 or Cmpd60), is a histone deacetylase (HDAC) inhibitor which is used in scientific research. It has been described in the past as the prototypical selective HDAC1 and HDAC2 inhibitor. However, subsequent findings suggest that BRD-6929 may not actually be selective for HDAC1 and HDAC2 over HDAC3.

== Pharmacology ==
=== Pharmacodynamics ===
BRD-6929 activities
Enzyme	IC_{50} (nM)
HDAC1	1
HDAC2	8–13
HDAC3	398–458
HDAC4	>33,000
HDAC5	>33,000
HDAC6	>33,000
HDAC7	>33,000
HDAC8	>33,000
HDAC9	>33,000
HDAC10	3,400
Refs:

BRD-6929 is a selective inhibitor of HDAC1 and HDAC2, with IC_{50} values of 1 nM and 8–30 nM, respectively, and with 30- to 400-fold selectivity over HDAC3 (IC_{50} = 398–458 nM) and no inhibition of HDAC8 or class II HDACs (IC_{50} = >30,000 nM). However, although originally reported to be selective for inhibition of HDAC1 and HDAC2 over HDAC3, subsequent research has found that BRD-6929 is not in fact selective over HDAC3, with previous findings being claimed to have been an assay artifact. As a result, BRD-6929 is no longer recommended as a selective HDAC1 and HDAC2 inhibitor. The drug shows slow-on/slow-off binding kinetics and hence more sustained HDAC inhibition, unlike other HDAC inhibitors like the fast-on/fast-off vorinostat (SAHA) and entinostat (MS-275). Aside from the HDACs, it also showed no binding at 80 other targets at a concentration of 10,000 nM.

BRD-6929 produces antidepressant-like and mood-stabilizing-like effects in rodents. This included reducing immobility in the forced swim test (FST) and attenuating amphetamine-induced hyperlocomotion without affecting basal locomotor activity. Conversely, vorinostat was ineffective in these tests. In addition, vorinostat showed dissimilar and lesser effects on gene transcription compared to BRD-6929. These differences may be related to selectivity and duration of exposure, with sustained exposure as with BRD-6929 possibly being advantageous. Aside from its acute effects, BRD-6929 was not well-tolerated and compromised health with chronic administration for 10 days in rodents, whereas no health compromise was observed with chronic administration of vorinostat. On the other hand, in another study, BRD-6929 produced longevity-enhancing effects in rodents in multiple organ systems, including the kidney, brain, and heart. BRD-6929 has been found to rescue chlorpyrifos-induced social deficits in zebrafish similarly to butyric acid (butyrate).

=== Pharmacokinetics ===
The pharmacokinetics of BRD-6929 in animals have been described. The drug penetrates into the brain in rodents. In addition, unlike vorinostat, it showed a sustained duration in the brain in rodents (t1/2 = 0.44 hours and 6.44 hours, respectively). BRD-6929 also penetrates into the brain in baboons, albeit with relatively low brain levels compared to plasma levels.

== Chemistry ==
In terms of chemical structure, BRD-6929 is an ortho-aminoanilide or benzamide and is a close analogue of tacedinaline (CI-994), differing from it only in the addition of a thiophene ring on one of the phenyl rings.

== History ==
BRD-6929 was first described in the scientific literature in 2005. Subsequently, it was described in greater detail in 2013 and thereafter. The drug's apparent lack of selectivity for HDAC1 and HDAC2 over HDAC3 was first described in 2022.

== See also ==
- Histone deacetylase inhibitor
- Tacedinaline (CI-994)
- RGFP966
