= RGFP136 =

Clinical data
- Other names: RGFP-136; Repligen-136; "Compound 136"
- Drug class: Histone deacetylase inhibitor; HDAC3 inhibitor; Cognitive enhancer
- ATC code: None

Identifiers
- IUPAC name: N-[6-(2-amino-4-fluoroanilino)-6-oxohexyl]-4-methylbenzamide
- PubChem CID: 46174525
- ChemSpider: 58169155
- ChEBI: CHEBI:125314
- ChEMBL: ChEMBL3958365

Chemical and physical data
- Formula: C_{20}H_{24}FN_{3}O_{2}
- Molar mass: 357.429 g·mol^{−1}
- 3D model (JSmol): Interactive image
- SMILES: CC1=CC=C(C=C1)C(=O)NCCCCCC(=O)NC2=C(C=C(C=C2)F)N
- InChI: InChI=1S/C20H24FN3O2/c1-14-6-8-15(9-7-14)20(26)23-12-4-2-3-5-19(25)24-18-11-10-16(21)13-17(18)22/h6-11,13H,2-5,12,22H2,1H3,(H,23,26)(H,24,25); Key:BEFOBMGNAJJGSD-UHFFFAOYSA-N

RGFP136 activities
Enzyme	IC_{50} (nM)
HDAC1	1,140–5,200
HDAC2	3,000
HDAC3	400–560
HDAC4	>180,000
HDAC5	>180,000
HDAC6	>180,000
HDAC7	>180,000
HDAC8	13,200
HDAC9	ND
HDAC10	ND
HDAC11	ND
Refs:

RGFP136, or RGFP-136, is a histone deacetylase (HDAC) inhibitor which is used in scientific research. It is a modestly selective or preferential HDAC3 inhibitor, with an IC_{50} value of 400–560 nM, whereas the drug showed 2- to 13-fold lower inhibitory potency at HDAC1 and HDAC2 (IC_{50} = 1,140–5,200 nM and 3,000 nM, respectively). It shows weak inhibition of HDAC8 and no inhibition of several other HDACs, including HDAC4, HDAC5, HDAC6, and HDAC7. RGFP136 has been found to enhance long-term memory in rodents, which led to conclusions that HDAC3 is a critical negative regulator of long-term memory formation. It has also been found to improve symptoms in an animal model of Friedreich ataxia. The drug's pharmacokinetics have been studied and it is brain-penetrant in rodents. RGFP136 was first described in the scientific literature by 2011.

== See also ==
- Histone deacetylase inhibitor
- RGFP963
- RGFP966
