= Acedoben =

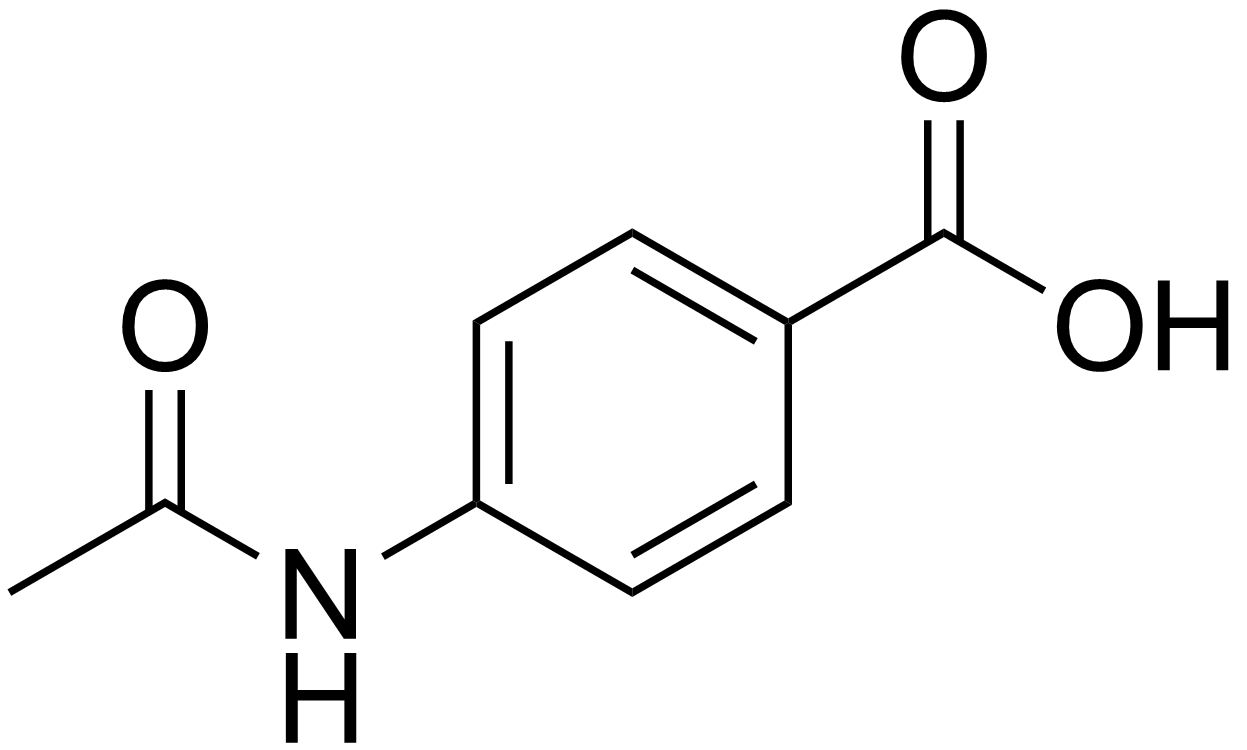
- Skeletal formula

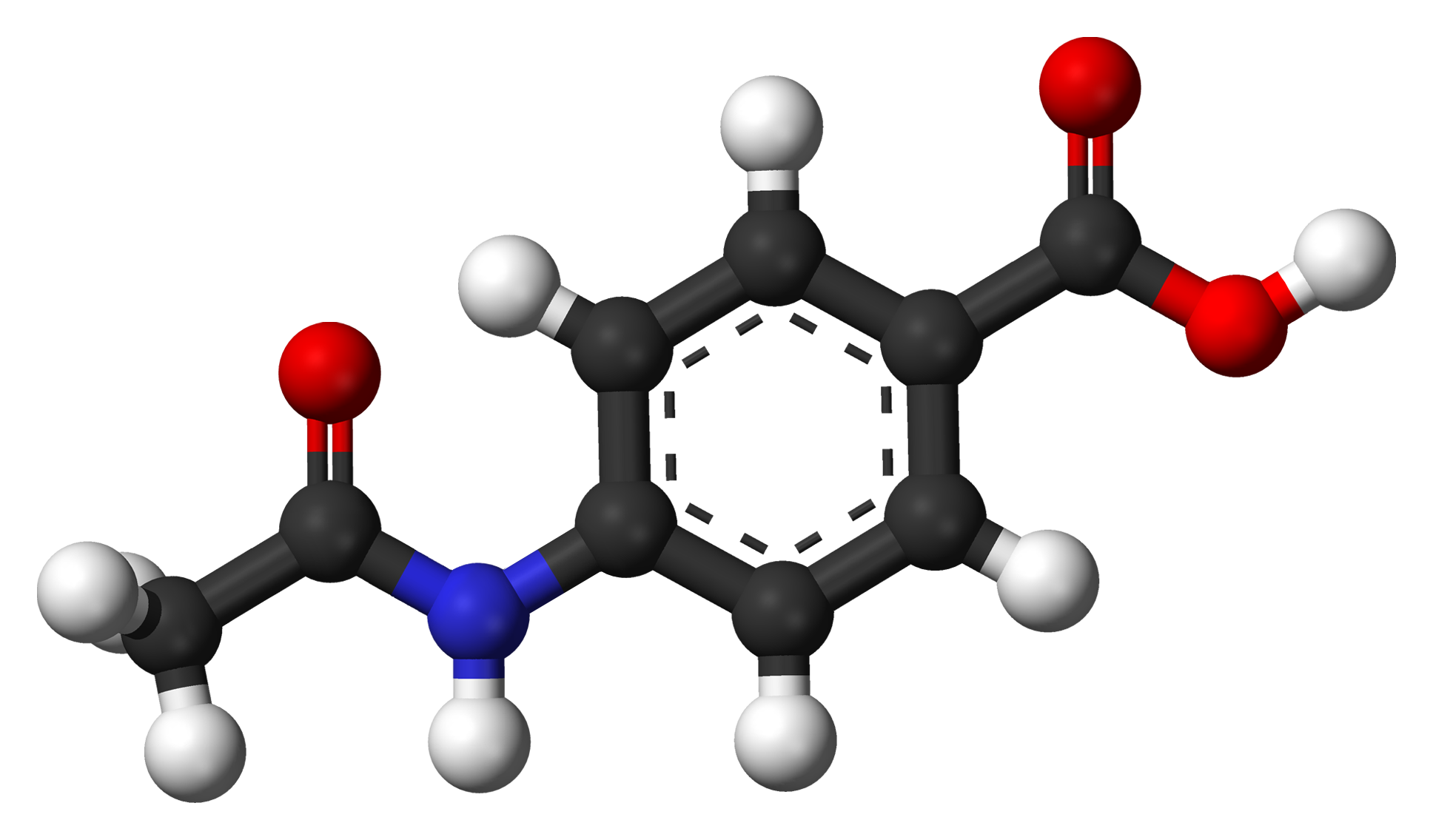
- Ball-and-stick model

Names
- Preferred IUPAC name 4-Acetamidobenzoic acid
- Other names N-Acetyl-PABA; 4-Carboxyacetanilide; p-Acetamidobenzoic acid p-Acetaminobenzoic acid; PAAB; p-Acetoaminobenzoic acid

Identifiers
CAS Number	556-08-1
3D model (JSmol)	Interactive image; Interactive image; Interactive image
ChEMBL	ChEMBL112687
ChemSpider	18177
DrugBank	DB04500
ECHA InfoCard	100.008.287
PubChem CID	19266
UNII	04Z20NMK31
CompTox Dashboard (EPA)	DTXSID5024392
- InChI: InChI=1S/C9H9NO3/c1-6(11)10-8-4-2-7(3-5-8)9(12)13/h2-5H,1H3,(H,10,11)(H,12,13) Key: QCXJEYYXVJIFCE-UHFFFAOYSA-N; InChI=1/C9H9NO3/c1-6(11)10-8-4-2-7(3-5-8)9(12)13/h2-5H,1H3,(H,10,11)(H,12,13) Key: QCXJEYYXVJIFCE-UHFFFAOYAT; InChI=1S/C9H9NO3/c1-6(11)10-8-4-2-7(3-5-8)9(12)13/h2-5H,1H3,(H,10,11)(H,12,13) Key: QCXJEYYXVJIFCE-UHFFFAOYSA-N
- SMILES: O=C(Nc1ccc(cc1)C(=O)O)C; O=C(Nc1ccc(cc1)C(=O)O)C; CC(=O)NC1=CC=C(C=C1)C(=O)O

Properties
Chemical formula	C_{9}H_{9}NO_{3}
Molar mass	179.175 g·mol^{−1}
Melting point	259 to 262 °C (498 to 504 °F; 532 to 535 K) (dec.)
- Except where otherwise noted, data are given for materials in their standard state (at 25 °C [77 °F], 100 kPa). verify (what is ?) Infobox references

Acedoben (4-acetamidobenzoic acid or N-acetyl-PABA) is a chemical compound with the molecular formula of C_{9}H_{9}NO_{3}. It is the acetyl derivative of para-aminobenzoic acid (PABA).

Acedoben, as a salt with dimepranol, is a component of some pharmaceutical preparations such as inosine pranobex.

Tacedinaline

Acedoben has application in the synthesis of a drug that is called Tacedinaline.

== See also ==
- N-Acetylanthranilic acid is an positional isomer of this compound
