= RGFP963 =

Clinical data
- Other names: RGFP-963
- Drug class: Histone deacetylase inhibitor; HDAC1, HDAC2, and HDAC3 inhibitor; Cognitive enhancer
- ATC code: None

Identifiers
- IUPAC name: (E)-N-(2-aminophenyl)-3-[1-[(E)-3-phenylprop-2-enyl]pyrazol-4-yl]prop-2-enamide
- CAS Number: 1396720-98-1
- PubChem CID: 60198484
- ChemSpider: 129454969
- ChEMBL: ChEMBL4748688

Chemical and physical data
- Formula: C_{21}H_{20}N_{4}O
- Molar mass: 344.418 g·mol^{−1}
- 3D model (JSmol): Interactive image
- SMILES: C1=CC=C(C=C1)/C=C/CN2C=C(C=N2)/C=C/C(=O)NC3=CC=CC=C3N
- InChI: InChI=1S/C21H20N4O/c22-19-10-4-5-11-20(19)24-21(26)13-12-18-15-23-25(16-18)14-6-9-17-7-2-1-3-8-17/h1-13,15-16H,14,22H2,(H,24,26)/b9-6+,13-12+; Key:KOESHVZEHKMOIK-UXKPLKHMSA-N

RGFP963 activities
Enzyme	IC_{50} (nM)
HDAC1	1,510
HDAC2	750
HDAC3	96
HDAC4	>20,000
HDAC5	>20,000
HDAC6	>20,000
HDAC7	>20,000
HDAC8	>20,000
HDAC9	>20,000
HDAC10	6,640–10,000
HDAC11	27,700
Refs:

RGFP963, or RGFP-963, is a histone deacetylase (HDAC) inhibitor which is used in scientific research. It is a selective class I HDAC inhibitor, including of HDAC1, HDAC2, and HDAC3 (IC_{50} = 1,510 nM, 750 nM, and 96 nM, respectively). The drug also weakly inhibits HDAC10 (IC_{50} = 6,640–10,000 nM), whereas it showed no inhibition of other HDACs at a concentration of up to 20,000 nM. RGFP963 enhances the consolidation of cued fear extinction in rodents, with this thought to be mediated by inhibition of HDAC1 and/or HDAC2 and not by inhibition of HDAC3. In addition, the drug promotes synaptogenesis in vitro and enhances memory in an animal model of Alzheimer's disease in rodents. It also enhanced cognition in a model of amyotrophic lateral sclerosis (ALS) in rodents. The pharmacokinetics of RGFP963 have been studied and it is brain-penetrant in rodents. RGFP963 was first described in the scientific literature by 2015.

== See also ==
- Histone deacetylase inhibitor
- RGFP136
- RGFP966
