= C5H13NO =

The molecular formula C_{5}H_{13}NO (molar mass: 103.16 g/mol, exact mass: 103.0997 u) may refer to:

- 5-Amino-1-pentanol
- Dimethylaminoisopropanol
- Neurine
- Valinol
