= Flowering Locus C =

MADS-box gene found in flowering plants

Flowering Locus C (FLC) is a MADS-box gene that in late-flowering ecotypes of the plant Arabidopsis thaliana is responsible for vernalization. In a new seedling FLC is expressed, which prevents flowering. Upon exposure to cold, less FLC is expressed (to a degree depending on the amount of cold), and flowering becomes possible. FLC is extensively regulated through epigenetic modifications and transcriptional control.

The expression of FLC is affected by other genes including FLK, FCA and VERNALIZATION2 (VRN2).

Wild Arabidopsis plants have different alleles for the FLC gene, which correspond to ecotypes which either (a) flower rapidly and produce a number of generations during one summer (summer-annual), or (b) flower only after vernalization (winter-annual or late-flowering). This kind of variation can also be provided by variation in the FRIGIDA (FRI) gene.
