= C15H15N3O2 =

The molecular formula C_{15}H_{15}N_{3}O_{2} (molar mass: 269.304 g/mol) may refer to:

- Tacedinaline
- Methyl red
