= 3-hydroxy-2-methylquinolin-4-one 2,4-dioxygenase =

Class of enzymes

Identifiers
- EC no.: 1.13.11.48

Databases
- IntEnz: IntEnz view
- BRENDA: BRENDA entry
- ExPASy: NiceZyme view
- KEGG: KEGG entry
- MetaCyc: metabolic pathway
- PRIAM: profile
- PDB structures: RCSB PDB PDBe PDBsum
- Gene Ontology: AmiGO / QuickGO
Search
- PMC: articles
- PubMed: articles
- NCBI: proteins

3-hydroxy-2-methylquinolin-4-one 2,4-dioxygenase (EC 1.13.11.48) is an enzyme that catalyzes the chemical reaction

3-hydroxy-2-methylquinolin-4(1H)-one
O_{2}
CO
N-Acetylanthranilic acid

The two substrates of this enzyme are 3-hydroxy-2-methylquinolin-4(1H)-one and oxygen. Its products are N-acetylanthranilic acid and carbon monoxide.

This enzyme belongs to the family of oxidoreductases, specifically those acting on single donors with O_{2} as oxidant and incorporation of two atoms of oxygen into the substrate (oxygenases). The oxygen incorporated need not be derived from O_{2}. The systematic name of this enzyme class is 3-hydroxy-2-methyl-1H-quinolin-4-one 2,4-dioxygenase (CO-forming). This enzyme is also called (1H)-3-hydroxy-4-oxoquinaldine 2,4-dioxygenase.
