= MiR444 microRNA precursor family =

Short RNA molecule

miR444

Identifiers
- Symbol: miR444
- Rfam: RF00920
- miRBase family: MIPF0000402

Other data
- RNA type: microRNA
- Domain: Viridiplantae
- PDB structures: PDBe

miR444 is a family of plant microRNAs found primarily in monocotyledon species such as rice and other grasses. Members of the miR444 family regulate gene expression by directing cleavage or translational repression of target mRNAs.

== Function ==
miR444 targets transcripts encoding MADS-box transcription factors, particularly members of the AGL17 clade that regulate developmental processes such as root architecture and tiller formation.

In rice (Oryza sativa), miR444 genes are frequently located within introns of MADS-box genes and are produced from natural antisense transcript pairs. These natural antisense microRNAs (nat-miRNAs) can base pair with their targets with high complementarity and regulate them through cleavage of the corresponding messenger RNAs.

miR444 participates in nutrient signaling pathways in rice. Overexpression of miR444a alters root architecture and affects nitrate accumulation and phosphate-starvation responses, indicating a role in coordinating nitrogen and phosphorus signaling networks.

miR444 also contributes to antiviral defense in rice. Viral infection can induce miR444 expression, which in turn represses MADS-box transcription factors that normally suppress expression of the antiviral gene RDR1. Through this regulatory cascade, miR444 promotes activation of RNA-silencing–based antiviral responses.

== Evolution ==
Comparative genomic analyses indicate that MIR444 genes originated in monocots through partial inverted duplication of antisense-transcribed sequences of their target genes. This mechanism generated natural antisense organization between MIR444 loci and MADS-box target genes and likely contributed to the evolution of miRNA-mediated regulation of these transcription factors.

== See also ==
- MicroRNA
