= RGFP966 =

Clinical data
- Other names: RGFP-966
- Drug class: Histone deacetylase inhibitor; HDAC3 inhibitor; Cognitive enhancer
- ATC code: None

Identifiers
- IUPAC name: (E)-N-(2-amino-4-fluorophenyl)-3-[1-[(E)-3-phenylprop-2-enyl]pyrazol-4-yl]prop-2-enamide
- CAS Number: 1357389-11-7
- PubChem CID: 56650312
- ChemSpider: 30208710
- ChEBI: CHEBI:131163
- ChEMBL: ChEMBL4078477
- CompTox Dashboard (EPA): DTXSID801026037

Chemical and physical data
- Formula: C_{21}H_{19}FN_{4}O
- Molar mass: 362.408 g·mol^{−1}
- 3D model (JSmol): Interactive image
- SMILES: C1=CC=C(C=C1)/C=C/CN2C=C(C=N2)/C=C/C(=O)NC3=C(C=C(C=C3)F)N
- InChI: InChI=1S/C21H19FN4O/c22-18-9-10-20(19(23)13-18)25-21(27)11-8-17-14-24-26(15-17)12-4-7-16-5-2-1-3-6-16/h1-11,13-15H,12,23H2,(H,25,27)/b7-4+,11-8+; Key:BLVQHYHDYFTPDV-VCABWLAWSA-N

RGFP966, or RGFP-966, is a histone deacetylase (HDAC) inhibitor which is used in scientific research. It is a highly selective HDAC3 inhibitor. The drug is the most commonly used selective HDAC3 inhibitor in research.

== Pharmacology ==
=== Pharmacodynamics ===
RGFP966 activities
Enzyme	IC_{50} (nM)
HDAC1	5,600–28,670
HDAC2	3,010–17,680
HDAC3	80–401
HDAC4	>20,000
HDAC5	>20,000
HDAC6	>20,000
HDAC7	>20,000
HDAC8	>100,000
HDAC9	>20,000
HDAC10	>20,000
HDAC11	>20,000
Refs:

RGFP966 is a histone deacetylase (HDAC) inhibitor, specifically acting as a highly selective HDAC3 inhibitor, with an IC_{50} of 80 nM and no inhibition of other HDACs at concentrations of up to 15,000 nM or 20,000 nM.

It enhances cognition, memory, and learning in rodents. The drug reverses age-related impairments in memory updating in rodents. In addition, it has been found to facilitate the extinction of drug-seeking behavior in a manner refractory to reinstatement in rodents. Conversely, unlike the pan-class I HDAC inhibitor RGFP963, RGFP966 failed to enhance consolidation of cued fear extinction in rodents, suggesting that HDAC1 and/or HDAC2 may be involved in this instead.

Also unlike pan-class I HDAC inhibitors, which can enhance synaptogenesis, RGFP966 showed minimal effect in this regard. The drug increases brain-derived neurotrophic factor (BDNF) expression. Knockdown of HDAC2 and knockdown of HDAC3 have been found to increase BDNF expression, whereas knockdown of other HDACs did not do so.

RGFP966 produces anti-inflammatory effects. It shows antidepressant-like effects against neuroinflammation-induced depression in rodents. Similarly to butyric acid (butyrate), RGFP966 ameliorates sleep deprivation-induced intestinal mucosa-induced damage in rodents. RGFP966 has neuroprotective and neurorestorative effects in preclinical research.

=== Pharmacokinetics ===
The pharmacokinetics of RGFP966 in rodents have been described. It efficiently crosses the blood–brain barrier in rodents.

== History ==
RGFP966 was first described in the scientific literature by 2013.

== See also ==
- Histone deacetylase inhibitor
- BRD-6929 (Cpd-60)
- RGFP136
- RGFP963
