= Mef2 =

Protein family

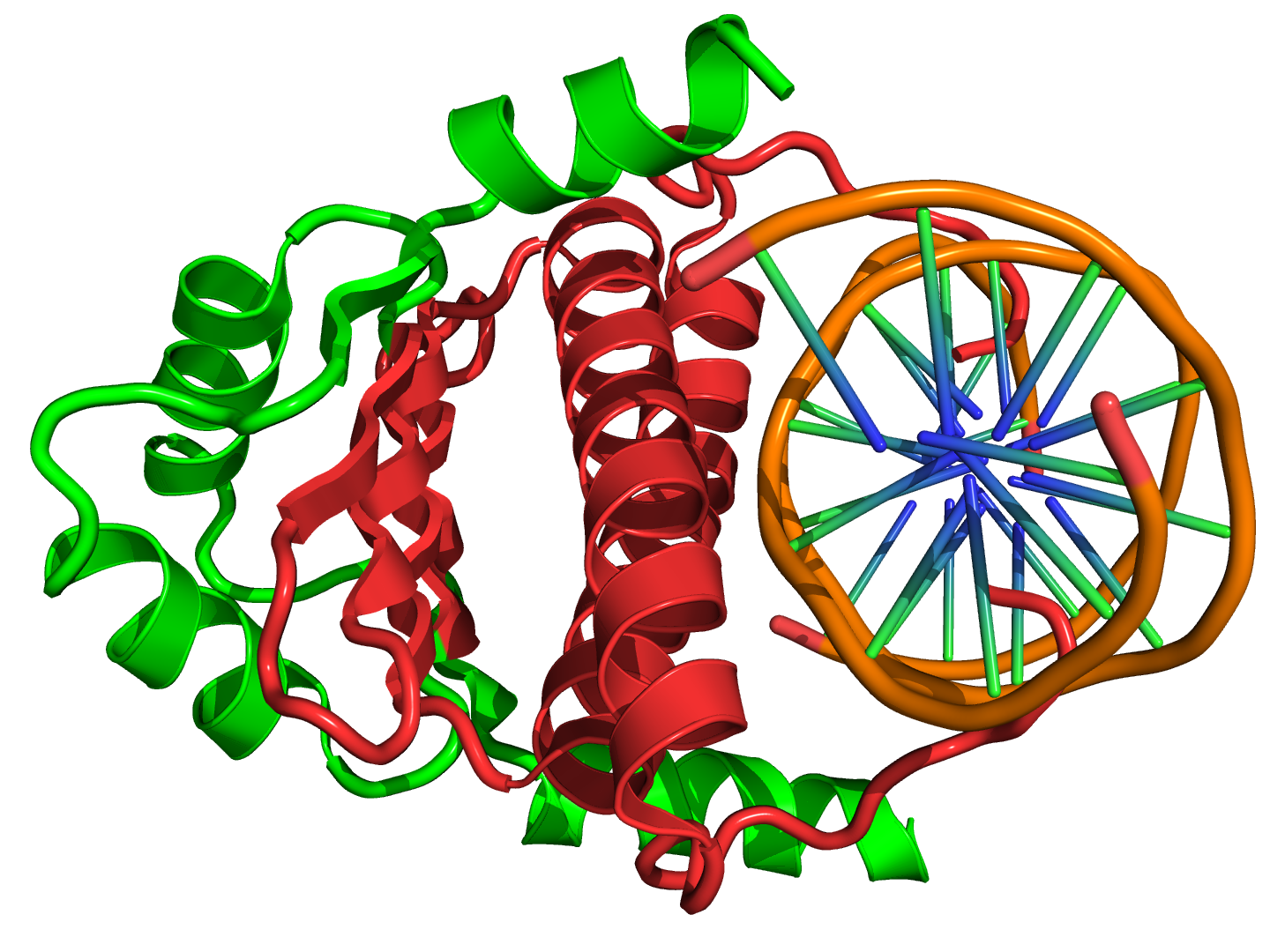
Dimeric structure of the MADS (red) and MEF2 (green) domains of the human MEF2B transcription factor complexed with DNA (orange) based on the PDB: 1N6J crystallographic coordinates.

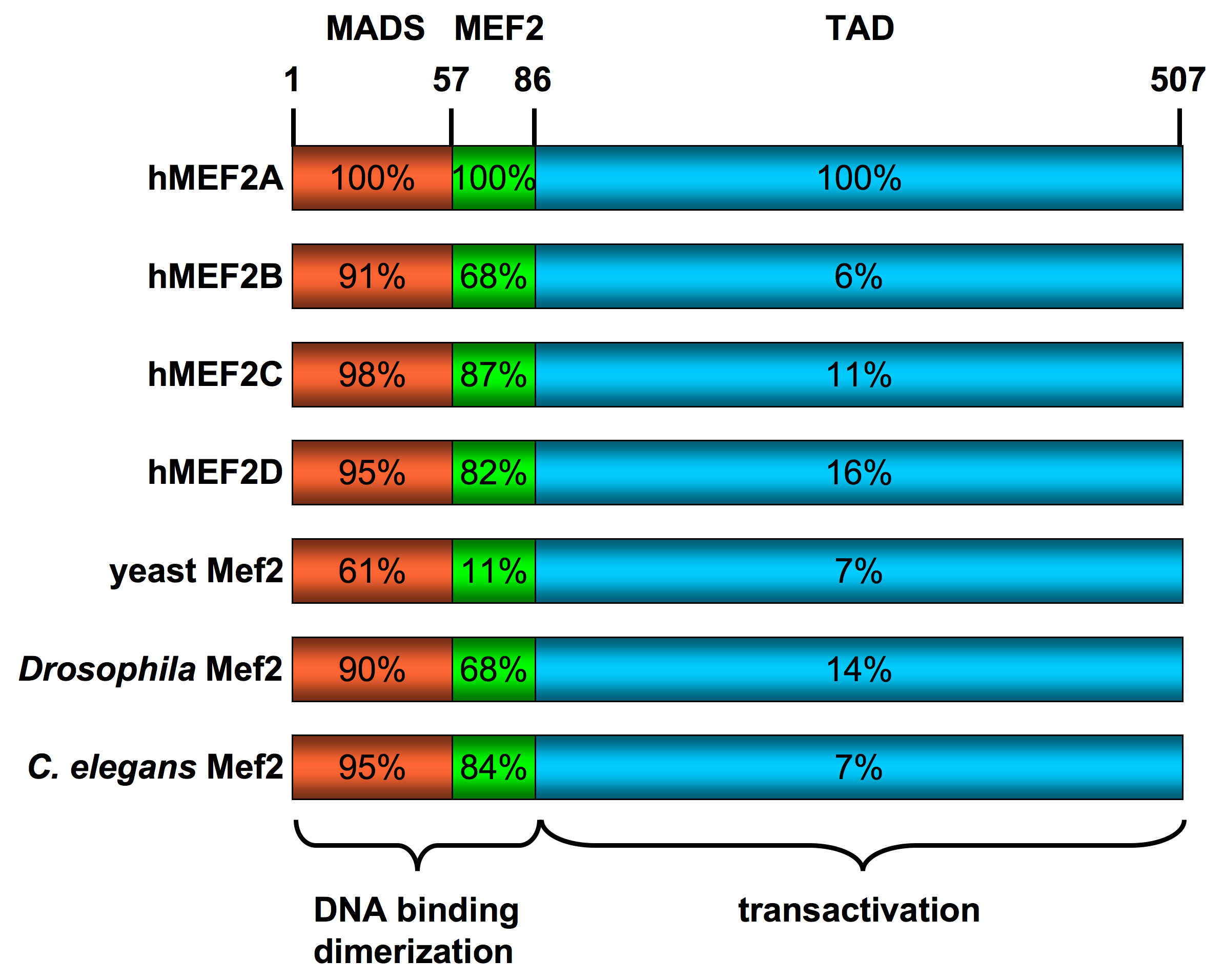
The domain organization and sequence comparison of Mef2 proteins from representative species. The amino acid numbering shown is of the human MEF2A sequence and the per cent sequence identities are all relative to hMEF2A. The three domain, MADS (red), MEF2 (green), and transactivation domains (TAD; cyan) are each highlighted in a different color.

In the field of molecular biology, myocyte enhancer factor-2 (Mef2) proteins are a family of transcription factors which through control of gene expression are important regulators of cellular differentiation and consequently play a critical role in embryonic development. In adult organisms, Mef2 proteins mediate the stress response in some tissues. Mef2 proteins contain both MADS-box and Mef2 DNA-binding domains.

== Discovery ==
Mef2 was originally identified as a transcription factor complex through promoter analysis of the muscle creatine kinase (mck) gene to identify nuclear factors interacting with the mck enhancer region during muscle differentiation. Three human mRNA coding sequences designated RSRF (Related to Serum Response Factor) were cloned and shown to dimerize, bind a consensus sequence similar to the one present in the MCK enhancer region, and drive transcription. RSRFs were subsequently demonstrated to encode human genes now named Mef2A, Mef2B and Mef2D.

== Species distribution ==
The Mef2 gene is widely expressed in all branches of eukaryotes from yeast to humans. While Drosophila has a single Mef2 gene, vertebrates have at least four versions of the Mef2 gene (human versions are denoted as MEF2A, MEF2B, MEF2C, and MEF2D), all expressed in distinct but overlapping patterns during embryogenesis through adulthood.

== Sequence and structure ==
All of the mammalian Mef2 genes share approximately 50% overall amino acid identity and about 95% similarity throughout the highly conserved N-terminal MADS-box and Mef2 domains, however their sequences diverge in their C-terminal transactivation domain (see figure to the right).

The MADS-box serves as the minimal DNA-binding domain, however an adjacent 29-amino acid extension called the Mef2 domain is required for high affinity DNA-binding and dimerization. Through an interaction with the MADS-box, Mef2 transcription factors have the ability to homo- and heterodimerize, and a classic nuclear localization sequence (NLS) in the C-terminus of Mef2A, -C, and – D ensures nuclear localization of the protein. D-Mef2 and human MEF2B lack this conserved NLS but are still found in the nucleus.

== Function ==
=== Development ===
In Drosophila, Mef2 regulates muscle development. Mammalian Mef2 can cooperate with bHLH transcription factors to turn non-muscle cells in culture into muscle. bHLH factors can activate Mef2c expression, which then acts to maintain its own expression.

Loss of Mef2c in neural crest cells results in craniofacial defects in the developing embryo and neonatal death caused by blocking of the upper airway passages. Mef2c upregulates the expression of the homeodomain transcription factors DLX5 and DLX6, two transcription factors that are necessary for craniofacial development.

=== Stress response ===
In adult tissues, Mef2 proteins regulate the stress-response during cardiac hypertrophy and tissue remodeling in cardiac and skeletal muscle.

=== Cardiovascular system ===
Mef2 is a critical regulator in heart development and cardiac gene expression. In vertebrates, there are four genes in the Mef2 transcription factor family: Mef2a, Mef2b, Mef2c, and Mef2d. Each is expressed at specific times during development. Mef2c, the first gene to be expressed in the heart, is necessary for the development of the anterior (secondary) heart field (AHF), which helps to form components of the cardiac outflow tract and most of the right ventricle. In addition, Mef2 genes are indicated in activating gene expression to aid in sprouting angiogenesis, the formation of new blood vessels from existing vessels.

== Knockout studies ==
In mice, knockout studies of Mef2c have demonstrated that crucial role that it plays in heart development. Mice without the Mef2c die during embryonic day 9.5–10 with major heart defects, including improper looping, outflow tract abnormalities, and complete lack of the right ventricle. This indicates improper differentiation of the anterior heart field. When Mef2c is knocked out specifically in the AHF, the mice die at birth with a range of outflow tract defects and severe cyanosis. Thus, Mef2 is necessary for many aspects of heart development, specifically by regulating the anterior heart field.

== Additional Information ==
MEF2, Myocyte Enhancer Factor 2, is a transcription factor with four specific numbers such as MEF2A, B, C, and D. Each MEF2 gene is located on a specific chromosome. MEF2 is known to be involved in the development and the looping of the heart (Chen) MEF2 is necessary for myocyte differentiation and gene activation (Black). Both roles contribute to the heart structure, and if there is a disruption with MEF2 in embryonic development, it can lead to two phenotypic problems (Karamboulas). The Type-I phenotype can cause severe malformations to the heart and the type-II phenotype, while it looks normal, has a thin-walled myocardium which can cause cardiac insufficiency. Another problem that can arise is from the knockout gene MEF2C. MEF2C is known to be directly related to congenital heart disease when associated with Tdgf1 (teratocarcinoma-derived growth factor 1). If MEF2C improperly regulates Tdgf1, developmental defects arise, especially within the embryonic development of the heart. (Chen). The way that MEF2C interacts with the protein Tdgf1 is through the 〖Ca〗^(2+) signaling pathway, which is required to regulate different mechanisms. MicroRNA's, non-small coding RNAs, also play a specific role in regulating MEF2C. The expression of congenital heart disease is upregulated due to the downregulation of the microRNA miR-29C (Chen). A few other known diseases associated with the MEF2 family are liver fibrosis, cancers, and neurodegenerative diseases (Chen).
