= Inosine pranobex =

Mixture of chemical compounds

Isoprinosine INN: Inosine acedoben dimepranol
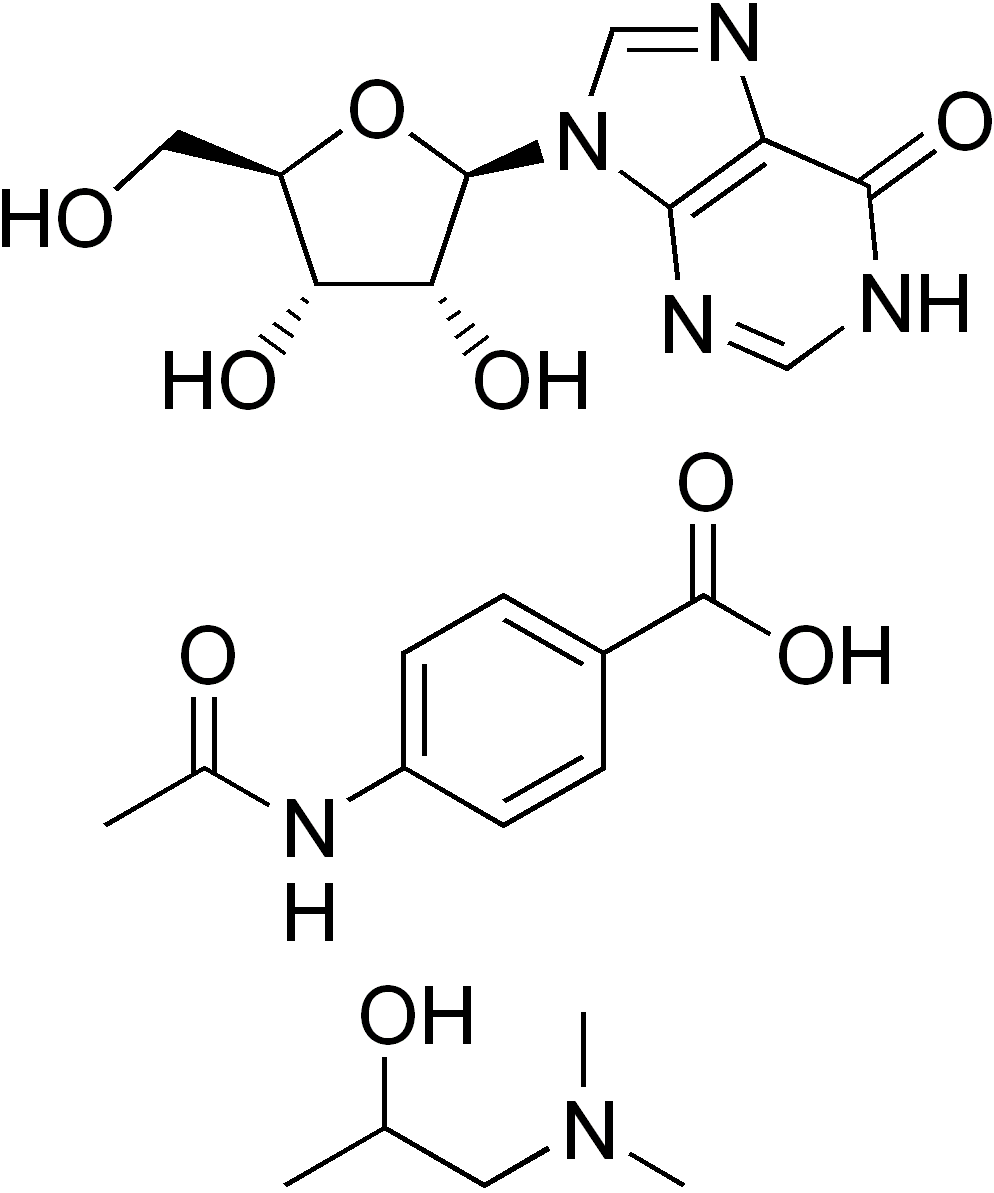
- Chemical structures of the three components of inosine pranobex (from top to bottom: inosine, acedoben and dimethylamino isopropanol)

Combination of
- Inosine: Immunostimulant
- Dimethylaminoisopropanol: Immunostimulant
- Acedoben: Immunostimulant

Clinical data
- Trade names: Imunovir, Delimmun, Isoprinosine
- Other names: Methisoprinol
- Routes of administration: Oral
- ATC code: J05AX05 (WHO)

Legal status
- Legal status: In general: ℞ (Prescription only)

Identifiers
- PubChem CID: 135449284
- ChemSpider: 16736312
- UNII: W1SO0V223F
- KEGG: D01995
- ECHA InfoCard: 100.048.313

Inosine pranobex (BAN; also known as inosine acedoben dimepranol (INN), methisoprinol, inosiplex or Isoprinosine) is an antiviral drug that is a combination of inosine and dimepranol acedoben (a salt of acetamidobenzoic acid and dimethylaminoisopropanol) in a ratio of 1 to 3. It is used primarily in European countries, especially as a treatment for acute viral infections, such as the common cold.

== Mechanism of action ==
=== Immunomodulatory effects ===
Inosine pranobex acts as an immunostimulant, an analog of thymus hormones. It is indicated for an entire spectrum of patients with clinical manifestations of immune deficiency. It modulates the immune system by immunostimulation or immunooptimisation of defensive inflammation at the cellular level, e.g. by interfering with energy metabolism, cell signalling and proliferation.

One of the main immunostimulatory effects of inosine pranobex lies in T-cell modulation. Its administration has been shown both in vivo and in vitro to induce Th1 cell-type response, as evidenced by the increase in pro-inflammatory cytokines (e.g. IL-2, ILN-γ) in mitogen- or antigen-activated cells. As such, T-cell maturation and differentiation is further fostered. The increase of ILN-γ in serum is proven to inhibit the production of IL-10, which could explain the drug's suppressive effect on anti-inflammatory cytokines.

It also modulates components of innate immunity. In respect to natural killer cells, both population and activity increased as a result of inosine pranobex therapy. It has also been proven that other cells of the innate immunity are affected, as neutrophil, monocyte and macrophage chemotaxis and phagocytosis were enhanced in cancer patients.

=== Antiviral properties ===
Inosine pranobex also has direct antiviral properties. Several hypotheses have been formed over time, but all of them agree that the drug has direct effect on viral RNA synthesis via inhibiting transcription and translation of the genetic code at cellular level.

In fact, cellular RNA and protein synthesis are markedly depressed shortly after viral infection, as the cell is instructed to focus resources on producing viral RNA instead. Inosine pranobex is believed to override this mechanism and incentivize cellular RNA synthesis over viral. It has been suggested that the drug itself, or any one of its components, directly acts on the ribosomes of infected cells providing an advantage to cellular RNA in competition for synthesis. This could also result in errors in the viral RNA transcription, which would hinder viral proliferation as well.

Another hypothesis suggests that inosine itself has direct antiviral properties, as evidenced by the rather fast metabolism of the compound.It is assumed that the drug breaks down metabolically into its constituents, therefore permitting direct inosine action. Inosine is proven to act on ribosome directly, as such one theory suggests that it inhibits the synthesis of phosphoribosyl pyrophosphate from ribose phosphate, the former being an intermediate in the biosynthesis of purine nucleotides such as adenylate and guanylate. A 2014 study has also shown that inosine affects DNA and RNA directly, as such the wobble mechanism, in which inosine replaces adenine, might result in errors in viral RNA furthermore.

It is apparent that inosine pranobex acts on the viral replication through many mechanisms, and is as such pleiotropic in nature. Most of these mechanisms are not specific to certain viruses and as such the drug is potent in treating a wide spectrum of viral infections, something that is rather uncommon for antivirals, as they tend to be very specific in their target. These mechanisms are also so general that no virus has been ever shown to develop resistance to them.

Macroscopically, antiviral activity has been documented in vivo on several animal models, and experimentally tested on the cytomegalovirus and influenza disease strains. In vitro, there is antiviral activity documented for many RNA and DNA viruses including, but not limited to: herpes simplex virus, cytomegalovirus, adenovirus, poliovirus, and influenza A and B viruses.

== Clinical applications ==
=== Preventive use ===
For patients with sub-optimally functioning immune systems, inosine pranobex can also be helpful in managing and decreasing the incidence of common viral infections, such as the common cold or influenza. As such, it is commonly prescribed to prevent illness, albeit at a lower dose. Several studies have investigated the benefits of inosine pranobex therapy in frequently ill children and returned positive results in both clinical and immunological outcomes.

=== Herpesvirus infections ===
Inosine pranobex has been suggested as an antiviral for herpesviruses, such as herpes simplex virus types 1 and 2, cytomegalovirus (CMV), and Epstein-Barr virus (EBV), The drug also proved helpful in managing complicated cases of lengthy reactivations of herpesviruses such as EBV, and subsequent post-viral fatigue.

=== Human papilloma virus (HPV) infections ===
Inosine pranobex may be prescribed for the treatment of HPV infections both benign and oncogenic, as a very safe and effective alternative therapy. Usually it is administered in combination with other treatment methods, such as CO_{2} laser and podophyllotoxin.

It was proven to be effective at treating genital warts in combination with conventional non-surgical treatments. It can also be used to treat vulvar HPV infection, and cervical dysplasia. It was also suggested as a possible alternative treatment for young women with chronic vulvodynia. Several long-term studies have shown efficacy even compared to surgical method at treating oral HPV-positive proliferative verrucous leucoplakia (PVL).

=== Influenza and rhinovirus infections ===
The evidence in treating rhinovirus infections is mixed. While no statistically significant effect was observed in rhinovirus 44 or 32 infection, its administration in rhinovirus 21 infection led to statistically improved health outcomes in patients, shortened infectivity and decreased viral shedding. In Influenza and Influenza-like (RSV, adenovirus and parainfluenza virus) infections, inosine pranobex did lower the symptom severity and duration.

=== COVID-19 ===
When the global coronavirus pandemic hit in 2020, inosine pranobex was one of the first medications used experimentally to treat the SARS-CoV-2 induced virosis, mainly due to its remarkably wide area of use and general antiviral properties. Several clinical trials were conducted returning largely positive results.

Its use was pioneered in the Czech Republic, where it was first noted that use greatly decreases mortality among elderly. In 2022, a large Phase 3 trial concluded that administration of inosine pranobex should start as early as possible with greatly improved outcomes in mild to moderate COVID-19 patients.

=== Type B and C viral hepatitis ===
In type B viral hepatitis, inosine pranobex was found ineffective during the acute phase of the infection, though in 28 days lower bilirubin and transaminase levels were detected. Greater number of patients became antigen-negative within a 90 day time-frame indicating a faster recovery rate.

Type C viral hepatitis was not studied as extensively, hence not so much data is available. It has been shown that inosine pranobex therapy in combination with ribavirin normalizes alanine aminotransferase levels in patients unresponsive to interferon treatment.

=== Myalgic encephalomyelitis/chronic fatigue syndrome (ME/CFS) ===
There is also some evidence of the drug being helpful in treating chronic post-viral fatigue. This might be indicative of the drug being effective even for other post-acute infection syndromes (PAIS), such as Long COVID (PASC). In 2003, the possibility of using inosine pranobex for treating myalgic encephalomyelitis/chronic fatigue syndrome was investigated experimentally and returned promising results, when 6 out of 10 subjects reported noticeable improvement. Promised large scale Phase II/III clinical trials confirming initially observed effects have not been conducted yet as of 2024.

In 2021, the US ME/CFS Clinician Coalition recommended the use of inosine pranobex for "immune dysfunction" symptoms, specifically "frequent viral infections, herpes simplex outbreaks, low natural killer cell activity, sore throat, tender nodes, low grade fevers".

=== Subacute sclerosing panencephalitis (SSPE) ===
Although the effect is unclear, several case reports have suggested that inosine pranobex may provide beneficial therapeutic effects in managing subacute sclerosing panencephalitis. Several long-term studies suggested that the drug both increased survival and decreased neurological deficiencies. It is not a cure for the illness though, as currently no cure exists.

=== Human immunodeficiency virus (HIV) and AIDS ===
Inosine pranobex has been suggested to delay AIDS progression in HIV-positive patients. In a phase I study of 831 HIV-positive patients conducted during the early phase of the HIV pandemic, prior to entry into clinical use of disease-specific and effective antiretroviral medications, inosine pranobex administration was found to be safe with no serious side effects reported.

== Dosing ==
For acute infection, the typical dose is 50 mg/day/kg of body weight. For prevention of chronic issues lower doses are typically recommended, usually under 2 g/day. The maximum dose permitted is around 4 g/day. The toxicity of the drug in humans is unknown, but doses upward of 1 g/kg of body weight were toxic in rodents.

== Safety ==
The most commonly found effects are nausea and vomiting. Hypotension, drowsiness and skin irritation may also occur. Metabolism of the inosine component of the drug can lead to an increase in uric acid levels in both blood and urine. The occurrence of transient reversible hyperuricaemia occurs in about 10% of patients taking inosine pranobex. Due to the potential risk of hyperuricosuria and the development of urate nephrolithiasis, increased fluid intake and exclusion of acidic foods is recommended during isoprinosine therapy. Its administration is not recommended in combination with immunosuppressing medicine.

Tolerance studies in healthy individuals and patients have consistently shown that inosine pranobex has no serious side effects and is remarkably well tolerated by the organism. Continuous administration of the drug for up to 7 years, at doses ranging from 1 to 8 g per day, has only occasionally caused transient nausea. This nausea was associated with a large number of tablets ingested. In addition, transient increases in serum and urinary uric acid levels have been reported. This increase in serum uric acid concentration is more common in male patients than in females.

Neither long-term damage not death from overdose have been reported in relation to inosine pranobex, doses upward of 1 g/kg of body weight were found to be toxic in rodents. The drug is metabolized very quickly, therefore any side effects should subside quickly with no long-term effects.

== History ==
The first studies conducted with the drug happened as early as the 1970s. It was licensed in 1971 with the first robust preliminary review of its efficacy having been published in 1986. Since the beginning, the drug was praised for its wide array of use cases, it was noted early on that it has a clinically noticeable effect on the immune function. In the 1990s, the possibility of the drug being used for HIV infection was also been investigated, with the results suggesting improved immune function. Nonetheless, following the development of more effective HIV drugs, this use case has been largely discontinued.

Throughout the 21st century, inosine pranobex has been used mainly in Central and Eastern Europe, in contrast to the United States, where the medication is not as widely available. In Central Europe, namely Poland, the medication is available over-the-counter under the brand name of Groprinosin® thanks to its safety and low risk of overdose.

In 2020, inosine pranobex was found to be a cheap and effective treatment for SARS-CoV-2 in cases not requiring hospitalization with fatality rate effectively halved as a result of its use.
