= FRM-0334 =

Clinical data
- Other names: FROM0334; EVP-0334; EVP0334
- Routes of administration: Oral
- Drug class: Histone deacetylase inhibitor
- ATC code: None

Identifiers
- PubChem SID: 381129062

FRM-0334, also known as EVP-0334, is a histone deacetylase (HDAC) inhibitor which was under development for the treatment of frontotemporal dementia (FTD), Alzheimer's disease, and Parkinson's disease but was never marketed. It is taken orally.

== Pharmacology ==
FRM-0334 is a selective inhibitor of a subset of class I and class II HDACs, with IC_{50} values in the nanomolar range. The pharmacokinetics of the drug in animals and humans have been studied. It efficiently crosses into the brain in rodents. The drug has been found to enhance cognition and memory in rodents. Based on preclinical research, it was expected to increase progranulin (PRGN) levels to help treat FTD.

== History ==
FRM-0334 was first described in the scientific literature by 2008. It was developed to overcome various limitations of existing HDAC inhibitors like sodium butyrate and valproic acid (low potency and selectivity), vorinostat (SAHA) (poor brain permeability), and trichostatin A (TSA) (genotoxicity) for central nervous system (CNS) disorders. The drug was developed by MethylGene, EnVivo Pharmaceuticals (later renamed to FORUM Pharmaceuticals), and Mirati Therapeutics. It reached phase 2 clinical trials prior to the discontinuation of its development. A phase 2 trial found the drug to be ineffective, possibly due to insufficient drug exposure. Development was discontinued in 2016 or 2018. The chemical structure of FRM-0334 does not appear to have been disclosed.

== See also ==
- Histone deacetylase inhibitor
- Tacedinaline (CI-994)
