= ZNF19 =

Protein-coding gene in the species Homo sapiens

Identifiers
- Aliases: ZNF19, KOX12, zinc finger protein 19
- External IDs: OMIM: 194525; GeneCards: ZNF19

Gene location (Human)
Chr.	Chromosome 16 (human)
Band	16q22.2	Start	71,464,555 bp
Band	16q22.2	End	71,565,089 bp
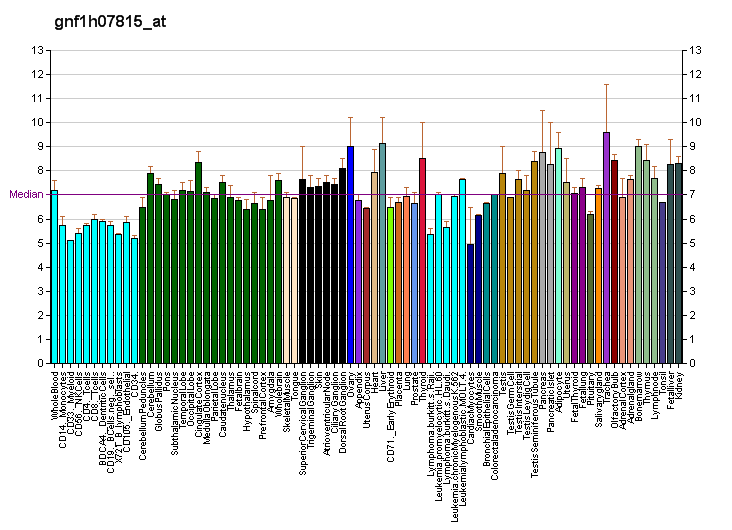
RNA expression pattern
Bgee	Human / Mouse (ortholog); Top expressed in: right uterine tube; mucosa of ileum; pancreatic ductal cell; tibialis anterior muscle; right testis; left testis; gonad; anterior pituitary; right lobe of thyroid gland; left lobe of thyroid gland / n/a; More reference expression data
BioGPS	More reference expression data
Gene ontology
Molecular function	DNA-binding transcription factor activity; DNA binding; metal ion binding; nucleic acid binding; DNA-binding transcription factor activity, RNA polymerase II-specific
Cellular component	intracellular anatomical structure; nucleus
Biological process	regulation of transcription, DNA-templated; transcription, DNA-templated; regulation of transcription by RNA polymerase II
Sources:Amigo / QuickGO
Orthologs
Databases	NCBI: entry; OMA: entry
Species	Human	Mouse
Entrez	7567	n/a
Ensembl	ENSG00000157429	n/a
UniProt	P17023	n/a
RefSeq (mRNA)	NM_006961; NM_152907	n/a
RefSeq (protein)	NP_008892	n/a
Location (UCSC)	Chr 16: 71.46 – 71.57 Mb	n/a
PubMed search		n/a
- Wikidata
View/Edit Human

Zinc finger protein 19 is a protein that in humans is encoded by the ZNF19 gene.

The protein encoded by this gene contains a zinc finger, a nucleic acid-binding domain present in many transcription factors. This gene is located in a region next to ZNF23, a gene also encoding a zinc finger protein, on chromosome 16.
