= CABIN1 =

Protein-coding gene in the species Homo sapiens

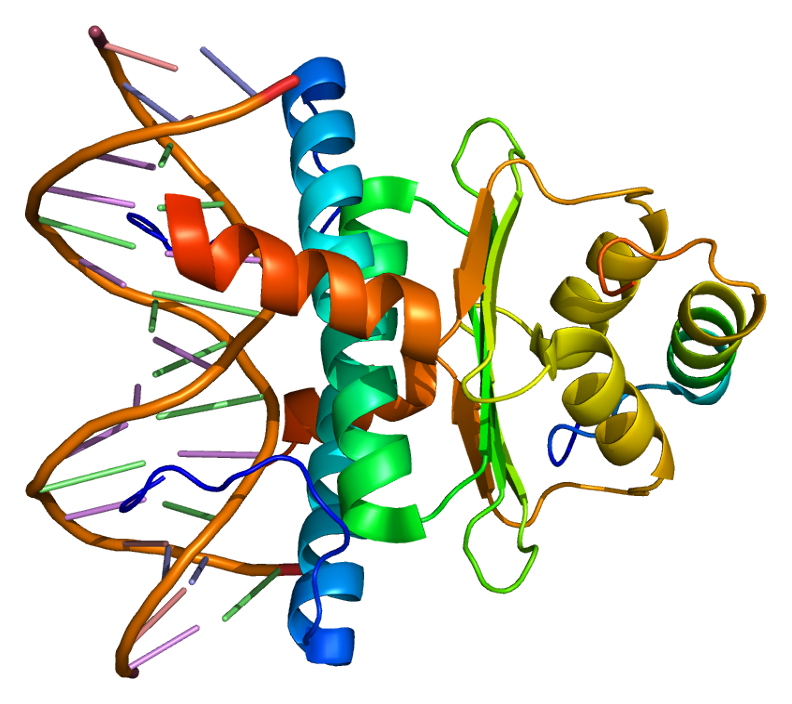

Identifiers
- Aliases: CABIN1, CAIN, PPP3IN, KB-318B8.7, calcineurin binding protein 1
- External IDs: OMIM: 604251; MGI: 1298375; GeneCards: CABIN1
Available structures
PDB	Human UniProt search: PDBe RCSB
PDB	List of PDB id codes 1N6J

Gene location (Human)
Chr.	Chromosome 22 (human)
Band	22q11.23	Start	24,011,192 bp
Band	22q11.23	End	24,178,628 bp

Gene location (Mouse)
Chr.	Chromosome 10 (mouse)
Band	10 C1|10 38.56 cM	Start	75,481,946 bp
Band	10 C1|10 38.56 cM	End	75,600,175 bp
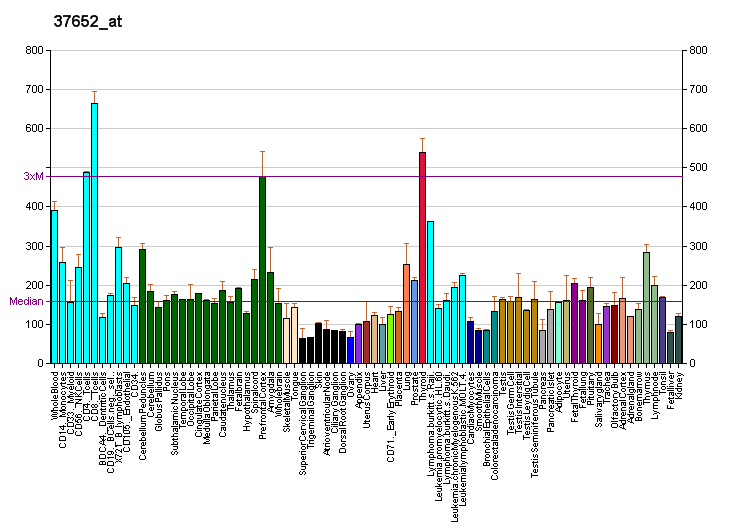

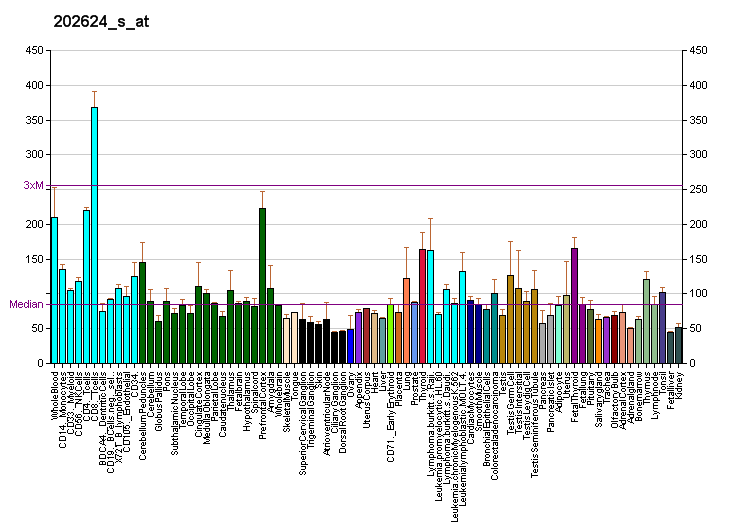
RNA expression pattern
Bgee	Human / Mouse (ortholog); Top expressed in: right hemisphere of cerebellum; paraflocculus of cerebellum; granulocyte; right uterine tube; right lobe of thyroid gland; right coronary artery; apex of heart; left lobe of thyroid gland; popliteal artery; tibial arteries / Top expressed in: zygote; granulocyte; secondary oocyte; primary visual cortex; ventricular zone; superior frontal gyrus; neural layer of retina; yolk sac; tail of embryo; lip; More reference expression data
BioGPS	More reference expression data
Gene ontology
Molecular function	protein phosphatase inhibitor activity; nucleosome binding
Cellular component	aggresome; nucleus; nucleoplasm; cytosol
Biological process	cell surface receptor signaling pathway; negative regulation of phosphoprotein phosphatase activity; chromatin organization
Sources:Amigo / QuickGO
Orthologs
Databases	NCBI: entry; OMA: entry
Species	Human	Mouse
Entrez	23523	104248
Ensembl	ENSG00000099991; ENSG00000281670	ENSMUSG00000020196
UniProt	Q9Y6J0	n/a
RefSeq (mRNA)	NM_001199281; NM_001201429; NM_012295	NM_172549
RefSeq (protein)	NP_001186210; NP_001188358; NP_036427	n/a
Location (UCSC)	Chr 22: 24.01 – 24.18 Mb	Chr 10: 75.48 – 75.6 Mb
PubMed search
- Wikidata
View/Edit Human	View/Edit Mouse

Calcineurin-binding protein cabin-1 is a protein that in humans is encoded by the CABIN1 gene.

== Function ==
Calcineurin plays an important role in the T-cell receptor-mediated signal transduction pathway. The protein encoded by this gene binds specifically to the activated form of calcineurin and inhibits calcineurin-mediated signal transduction. The encoded protein is found in the nucleus and contains a leucine zipper domain as well as several PEST motifs, sequences which confer targeted degradation to those proteins which contain them. At least four alternatively spliced transcripts have been found for this gene, but the full-length nature of most of them has not been determined.

== Interactions ==
CABIN1 has been shown to interact with:

- Amphiphysin,
- MEF2B,
- MEF2D, and
- SIN3A.
