= Tacedinaline =

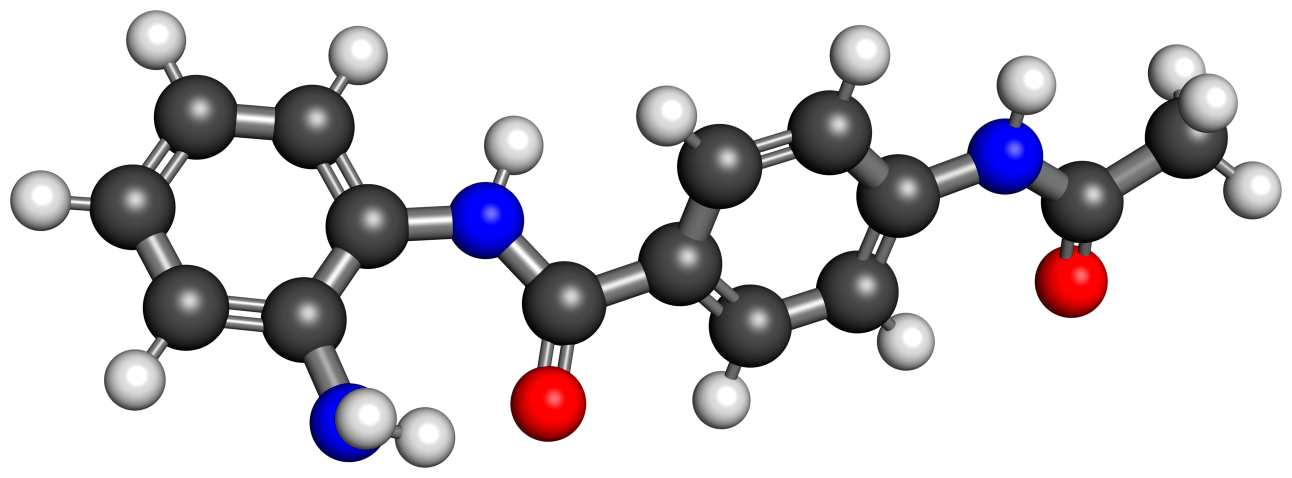

Clinical data
- Other names: Acetyldinaline; N-Acetyldinaline; CI-994; CI994; PD-123654; PD123654; PD-123,654; GOE-5549; GOE5549
- Routes of administration: Oral
- Drug class: Histone deacetylase inhibitor; Antineoplastic agent; Cognitive enhancer

Pharmacokinetic data
- Onset of action: 1–2 hours (T_{max})
- Elimination half-life: 9.6–14 hours

Identifiers
- IUPAC name: 4-acetamido-N-(2-aminophenyl)benzamide
- CAS Number: 112522-64-2 58338-59-3
- PubChem CID: 2746
- IUPHAR/BPS: 8367
- DrugBank: DB12291
- ChemSpider: 2644
- UNII: UMF554N5FG
- KEGG: D05988
- ChEBI: CHEBI:90195
- ChEMBL: ChEMBL235191
- CompTox Dashboard (EPA): DTXSID60150095
- ECHA InfoCard: 100.159.485

Chemical and physical data
- Formula: C_{15}H_{15}N_{3}O_{2}
- Molar mass: 269.304 g·mol^{−1}
- 3D model (JSmol): Interactive image
- SMILES: CC(=O)NC1=CC=C(C=C1)C(=O)NC2=CC=CC=C2N
- InChI: InChI=1S/C15H15N3O2/c1-10(19)17-12-8-6-11(7-9-12)15(20)18-14-5-3-2-4-13(14)16/h2-9H,16H2,1H3,(H,17,19)(H,18,20); Key:VAZAPHZUAVEOMC-UHFFFAOYSA-N

Tacedinaline (INN, USAN; developmental code name CI-994), also known as N-acetyldinaline, is a histone deacetylase (HDAC) inhibitor and possible cognitive enhancer which is under development for the treatment of Alzheimer's disease. It was also under development as an antineoplastic agent for the treatment of various cancers, but development for these uses was discontinued. The drug is taken orally.

== Side effects ==
Unlike many other less-selective HDAC inhibitors, which have often produced unwanted side effects, tacedinaline is said to be well-tolerated. However, adverse effects such as thrombocytopenia among others have nonetheless been observed in cancer treatment trials.

== Pharmacology ==
Tacedinaline activities
Enzyme	IC_{50} (nM)
HDAC1	41–636
HDAC2	147–696
HDAC3	46–472
HDAC4	>33,000
HDAC5	>33,000
HDAC6	>33,000
HDAC7	>33,000
HDAC8	>33,000
HDAC9	>33,000
HDAC10	>10,000
HDAC11	>10,000
Refs:

Tacedinaline is a potent inhibitor of the class I HDAC1, HDAC2, and HDAC3, with IC_{50} values of 41–636 nM, 147–696 nM, and 46–472 nM, respectively. The drug showed no inhibition of other HDACs, including HDAC4 through HDAC11, at a concentration of 10,000 to 33,000 nM. It is more selective for class I HDACs compared to many other HDAC inhibitors. In addition to its HDAC inhibition, tacedinaline also activates Wnt/β–catenin signaling and hence is said to have a dual mechanism of action. It enhances synaptogenesis, increases central brain-derived neurotrophic factor (BDNF) expression, and decreases tau phosphorylation in preclinical research. Tacedinaline enhances cognition and memory in rodents. It crosses the blood–brain barrier. The drug's time to peak levels is approximately 1 to 2 hours and elimination half-life is 9.6 to 14 hours in humans.

== Chemistry ==
The chemical synthesis of tacedinaline has been described. Glucuronide prodrugs of tacedinaline for targeted tumor chemotherapy have been described.

== History and development ==
Tacedinaline was first described in the scientific literature by 1993. It was developed by Goedecke and Pfizer. As of September 2024, the drug is in the preclinical research stage of development for Alzheimer's disease. It was also under development for the treatment of breast cancer, colorectal cancer, lung cancer, and pancreatic cancer, and reached phase 2 and 3 trials for these uses in the 2000s, but development was discontinued by 2008. Subsequently, tacedinaline was repurposed for the treatment of Alzheimer's disease in the 2020s.

== See also ==
- Histone deacetylase inhibitor
- BRD-6929 (Cpd-60)
- FRM-0334 (EVP-0334)
