= FRIGIDA =

Plant gene involved in flowering

FRIGIDA (FRI) is a plant gene involved in flowering in response to vernalization through interaction with FLOWERING LOCUS C (FLC). It has been notes as a significant source of natural variation between early-flowering and late-flowering accessions of the model plant Arabidopsis thaliana.

FRI induces FLC expression by forming a 5-protein complex on the FLC promoter which promotes transcription factor recruitment and chromatin modification. Downstream of this, FLC inhibits flowering by repressing floral induction-promoting genes such as FT and SOC1. During vernalization, FRI protein is degraded by the proteasome, while simultaneously chromatin modification to suppress FLC is done by CoolAIR and VIN3 which results in stable repression after the cold period. FLC expression is reset in the embryo.

FRIGIDA-Like genes have been identified across flowering plant species, even amongst those that don't require vernalization. While the FRI pathway is conserved among the Brassicaceae and in other species, other vernalization pathways exist. In Arabidopsis thaliana, two common ecotypes used in research, Columbia and Landsberg-Erecta, have mutation to FRI, allowing flowering in stable environments.
