= Myocyte-specific enhancer factor 2A =

Protein-coding gene in the species Homo sapiens

MEF2A
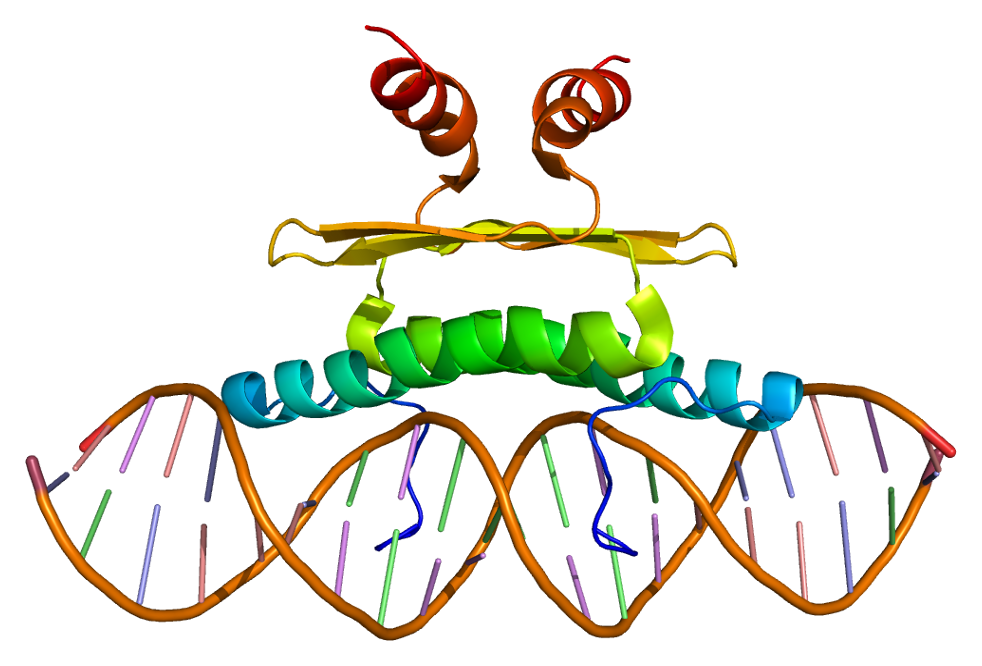

Identifiers
- Aliases: MEF2A, ADCAD1, RSRFC4, RSRFC9, mef2, myocyte enhancer factor 2A
- External IDs: OMIM: 600660; MGI: 99532; GeneCards: MEF2A
Available structures
PDB	Ortholog search: PDBe RCSB
PDB	List of PDB id codes 1C7U, 1EGW, 1LEW, 3KOV, 3MU6, 3P57

Gene location (Human)
Chr.	Chromosome 15 (human)
Band	15q26.3	Start	99,565,417 bp
Band	15q26.3	End	99,716,488 bp

Gene location (Mouse)
Chr.	Chromosome 7 (mouse)
Band	7 C|7 36.72 cM	Start	67,231,163 bp
Band	7 C|7 36.72 cM	End	67,372,858 bp
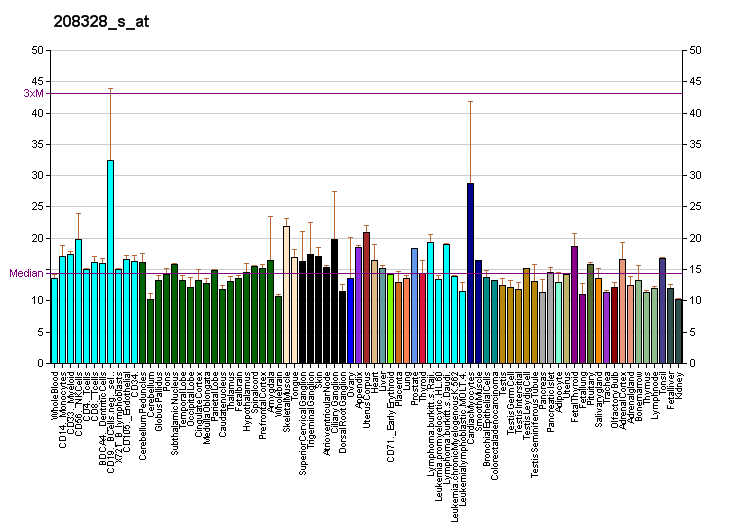

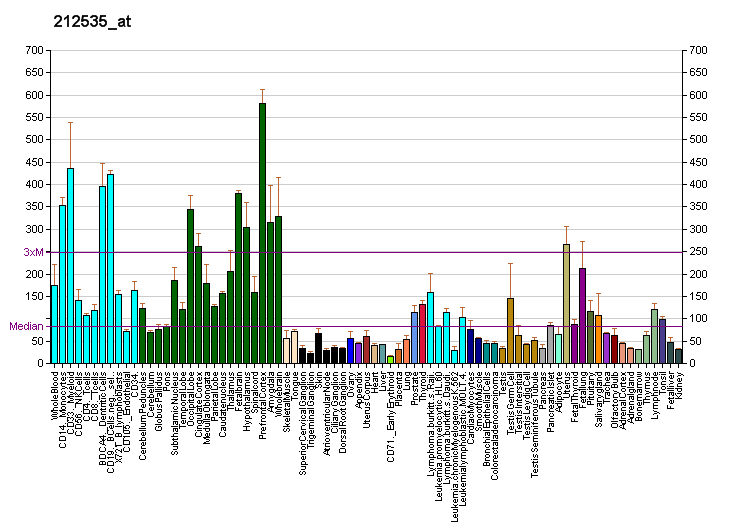

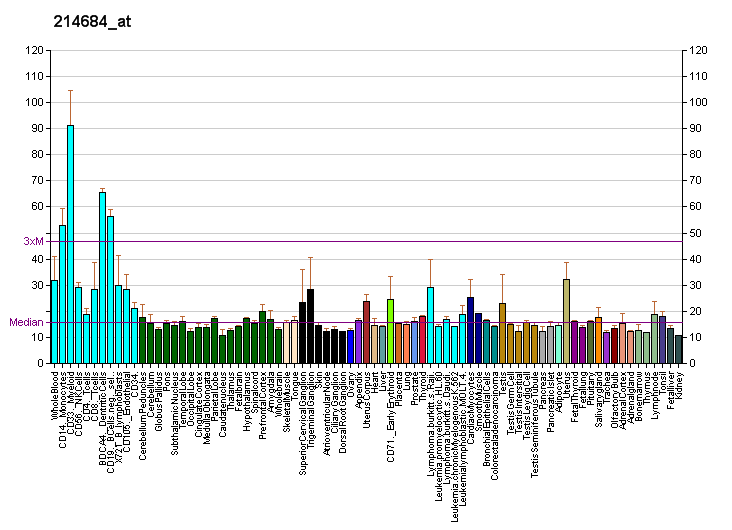
RNA expression pattern
Bgee	Human / Mouse (ortholog); Top expressed in: Achilles tendon; myocardium; cardiac muscle tissue of right atrium; right ventricle; myocardium of left ventricle; biceps brachii; Skeletal muscle tissue of biceps brachii; skin of thigh; middle temporal gyrus; tibia / Top expressed in: medial dorsal nucleus; lateral geniculate nucleus; lateral septal nucleus; medial geniculate nucleus; atrioventricular valve; stroma of bone marrow; right ventricle; atrium; cerebellar vermis; ankle; More reference expression data
BioGPS	More reference expression data
Gene ontology
Molecular function	sequence-specific DNA binding; transcription coactivator activity; DNA binding; protein dimerization activity; DNA-binding transcription factor activity; DNA-binding transcription activator activity, RNA polymerase II-specific; histone deacetylase binding; chromatin binding; RNA polymerase II cis-regulatory region sequence-specific DNA binding; protein binding; histone acetyltransferase binding; protein heterodimerization activity; transcription factor activity, RNA polymerase II distal enhancer sequence-specific binding; SMAD binding; protein kinase binding; RNA polymerase II transcription regulatory region sequence-specific DNA binding; DNA-binding transcription factor activity, RNA polymerase II-specific
Cellular component	transcription regulator complex; nucleoplasm; nucleus; cytosol
Biological process	cellular response to calcium ion; cell differentiation; regulation of transcription, DNA-templated; mitochondrial genome maintenance; dendrite morphogenesis; positive regulation of muscle cell differentiation; muscle organ development; negative regulation of transcription by RNA polymerase II; transcription, DNA-templated; nervous system development; ERK5 cascade; multicellular organism development; positive regulation of transcription, DNA-templated; development of the heart; cardiac conduction; mitochondrion distribution; ventricular cardiac myofibril assembly; positive regulation of transcription by RNA polymerase II; apoptotic process; positive regulation of cardiac muscle hypertrophy; transcription by RNA polymerase II; MAPK cascade; positive regulation of glucose import
Sources:Amigo / QuickGO
Orthologs
Databases	NCBI: entry; OMA: entry
Species	Human	Mouse
Entrez	4205	17258
Ensembl	ENSG00000068305	ENSMUSG00000030557
UniProt	Q02078	Q60929
RefSeq (mRNA)	NM_001130926; NM_001130927; NM_001130928; NM_001171894; NM_005587 NM_001319206; NM_001352614; NM_001352615; NM_001352616; NM_001352617; NM_001352618; NM_001365201; NM_001365202; NM_001365203; NM_001365204; NM_001365205; NM_001365206; NM_001365207; NM_001365208; NM_001365209; NM_001365210; NM_001365211; NM_001393558; NM_001393559; NM_001393560; NM_001393561	NM_001033713; NM_001291191; NM_001291192; NM_001291195; NM_001291196 NM_001357324; NM_001357325
RefSeq (protein)	NP_001124398; NP_001124399; NP_001124400; NP_001165365; NP_001306135 NP_005578; NP_001339543; NP_001339544; NP_001339545; NP_001339546; NP_001339547; NP_001352130; NP_001352131; NP_001352132; NP_001352133; NP_001352134; NP_001352135; NP_001352136; NP_001352137; NP_001352138; NP_001352139; NP_001352140	NP_001028885; NP_001278120; NP_001278121; NP_001278124; NP_001278125 NP_001344253; NP_001344254
Location (UCSC)	Chr 15: 99.57 – 99.72 Mb	Chr 7: 67.23 – 67.37 Mb
PubMed search
- Wikidata
View/Edit Human	View/Edit Mouse

Myocyte-specific enhancer factor 2A is a protein that in humans is encoded by the MEF2A gene. MEF2A is a transcription factor in the Mef2 family. In humans it is located on chromosome 15q26. Certain mutations in MEF2A cause an autosomal dominant form of coronary artery disease and myocardial infarction.

== Function ==
The process of differentiation from mesodermal precursor cells to myoblasts has led to the discovery of a variety of tissue-specific factors that regulate muscle gene expression. The myogenic basic helix-loop-helix proteins, including myoD (MIM 159970), myogenin (MIM 159980), MYF5 (MIM 159990), and MRF4 (MIM 159991) are 1 class of identified factors. A second family of DNA binding regulatory proteins is the myocyte-specific enhancer factor-2 (MEF2) family. Each of these proteins binds to the MEF2 target DNA sequence present in the regulatory regions of many, if not all, muscle-specific genes. The MEF2 genes are members of the MADS gene family (named for the yeast mating type-specific transcription factor MCM1, the plant homeotic genes 'agamous' and 'deficiens' and the human serum response factor SRF (MIM 600589)), a family that also includes several homeotic genes and other transcription factors, all of which share a conserved DNA-binding domain.[supplied by OMIM]

== Interactions ==
Myocyte-specific enhancer factor 2A has been shown to interact with:

- ASCL1,
- EP300,
- HDAC4,
- HDAC9,
- Histone deacetylase 5,
- MAPK14,
- MEF2D,
- Mothers against decapentaplegic homolog 2, and
- Thyroid hormone receptor alpha and
