= MEF2C =

Protein-coding gene in the species Homo sapiens

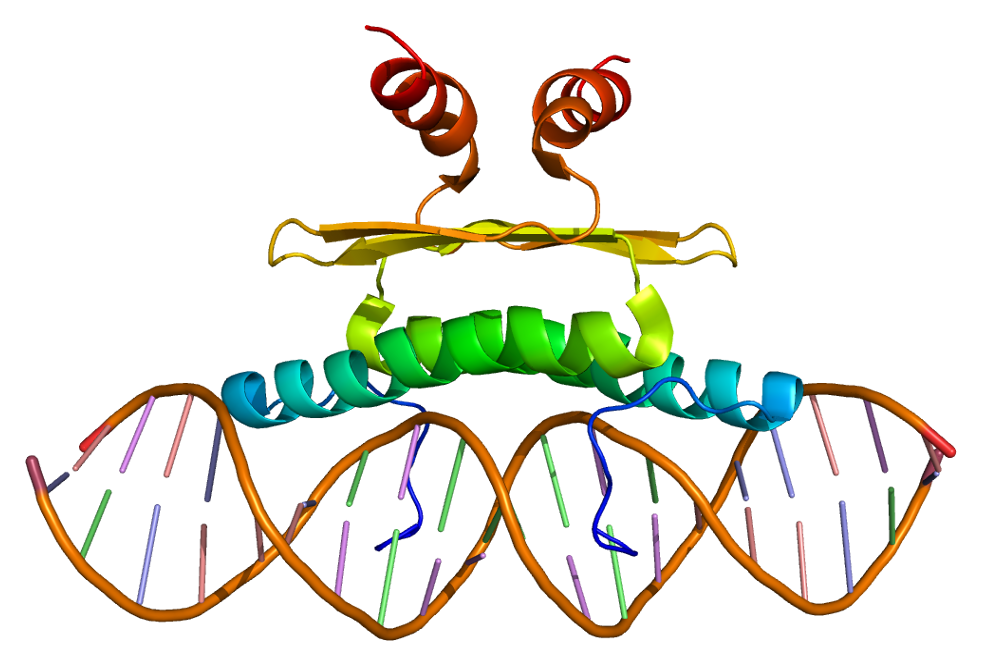

Identifiers
- Aliases: MEF2C, C5DELq14.3, DEL5q14.3, myocyte enhancer factor 2C
- External IDs: OMIM: 600662; MGI: 99458; GeneCards: MEF2C

Gene location (Human)
Chr.	Chromosome 5 (human)
Band	5q14.3	Start	88,717,117 bp
Band	5q14.3	End	88,904,257 bp
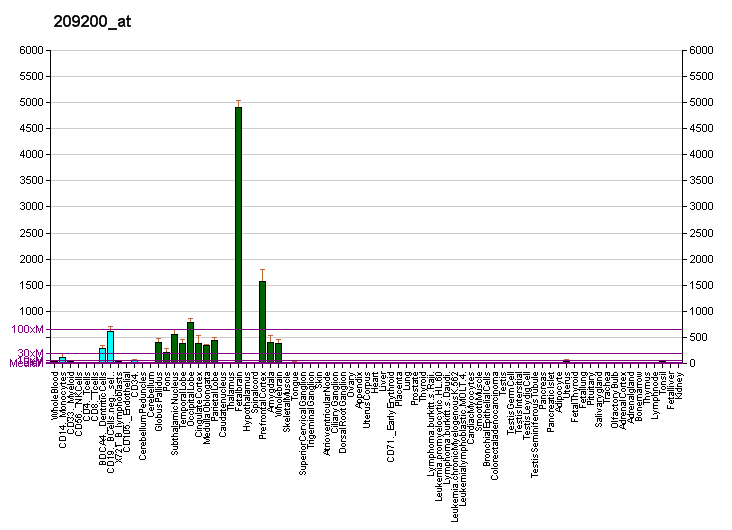

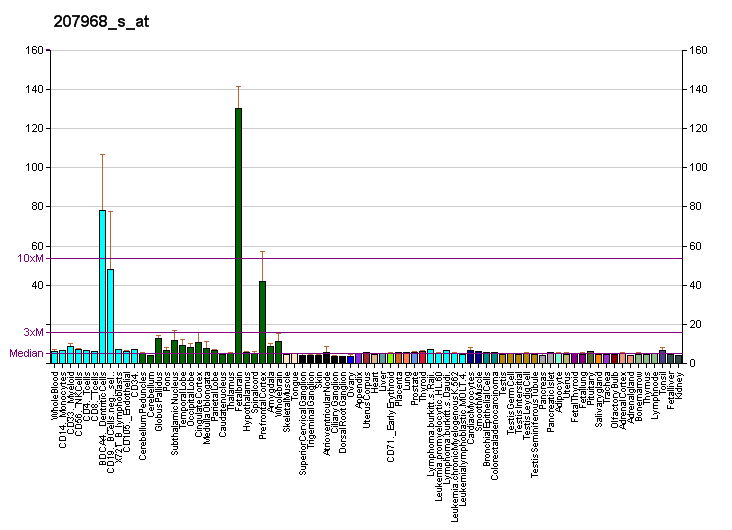

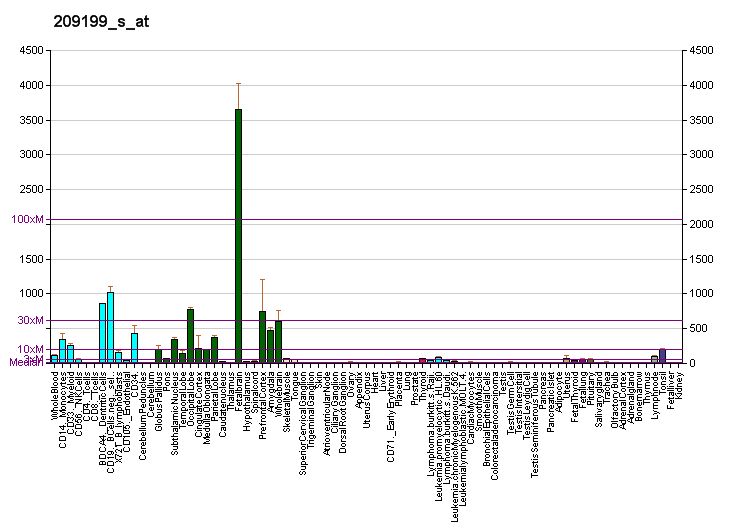
RNA expression pattern
Bgee	Human / Mouse (ortholog); Top expressed in: middle temporal gyrus; glutes; biceps brachii; Skeletal muscle tissue of biceps brachii; Brodmann area 23; Skeletal muscle tissue of rectus abdominis; vastus lateralis muscle; triceps brachii muscle; orbitofrontal cortex; frontal pole / n/a; More reference expression data
BioGPS	More reference expression data
Gene ontology
Molecular function	protein dimerization activity; DNA-binding transcription factor activity; DNA-binding transcription activator activity, RNA polymerase II-specific; histone deacetylase binding; RNA polymerase II general transcription initiation factor activity; core promoter sequence-specific DNA binding; RNA polymerase II transcription regulatory region sequence-specific DNA binding; HMG box domain binding; RNA polymerase II cis-regulatory region sequence-specific DNA binding; minor groove of adenine-thymine-rich DNA binding; chromatin binding; cis-regulatory region sequence-specific DNA binding; protein binding; DNA binding; sequence-specific DNA binding; protein heterodimerization activity; transcription factor activity, RNA polymerase II distal enhancer sequence-specific binding; DNA-binding transcription factor activity, RNA polymerase II-specific
Cellular component	nucleus; nuclear speck; intracellular membrane-bounded organelle; nucleoplasm; cytoplasm; postsynapse; sarcoplasm; protein-containing complex
Biological process	negative regulation of neuron apoptotic process; embryonic skeletal system morphogenesis; myotube differentiation; positive regulation of skeletal muscle tissue development; cell morphogenesis involved in neuron differentiation; positive regulation of muscle cell differentiation; regulation of synapse assembly; muscle organ development; outflow tract morphogenesis; monocyte differentiation; sinoatrial valve morphogenesis; negative regulation of ossification; heart looping; positive regulation of skeletal muscle cell differentiation; blood vessel remodeling; blood vessel development; positive regulation of cardiac muscle cell proliferation; humoral immune response; positive regulation of alkaline phosphatase activity; negative regulation of epithelial cell proliferation; regulation of synaptic transmission, glutamatergic; melanocyte differentiation; apoptotic process; B cell receptor signaling pathway; cellular response to calcium ion; cellular response to transforming growth factor beta stimulus; renal tubule morphogenesis; nephron tubule epithelial cell differentiation; cell fate commitment; cardiac ventricle formation; regulation of transcription, DNA-templated; cardiac muscle cell differentiation; regulation of neuron apoptotic process; platelet formation; neuron development; smooth muscle cell differentiation; positive regulation of protein homodimerization activity; negative regulation of gene expression; transcription, DNA-templated; cellular response to trichostatin A; positive regulation of transcription, DNA-templated; development of the heart; epithelial cell proliferation involved in renal tubule morphogenesis; cardiac muscle hypertrophy in response to stress; positive regulation of B cell proliferation; positive regulation of neuron differentiation; excitatory postsynaptic potential; learning or memory; positive regulation of macrophage apoptotic process; positive regulation of cardiac muscle cell differentiation; cellular response to parathyroid hormone stimulus; primary heart field specification; secondary heart field specification; regulation of dendritic spine development; regulation of germinal center formation; roof of mouth development; cell differentiation; chondrocyte differentiation; positive regulation of bone mineralization; neural crest cell differentiation; neuron migration; B cell homeostasis; negative regulation of transcription by RNA polymerase II; endochondral ossification; regulation of neurotransmitter secretion; cellular response to fluid shear stress; nervous system development; regulation of synaptic plasticity; regulation of NMDA receptor activity; muscle cell fate determination; positive regulation of osteoblast differentiation; regulation of synaptic activity; osteoblast differentiation; neuron differentiation; regulation of sarcomere organization; skeletal muscle cell differentiation; positive regulation of behavioral fear response; glomerulus morphogenesis; germinal center formation; positive regulation of cell proliferation in bone marrow; MAPK cascade; regulation of AMPA receptor activity; multicellular organism development; B cell proliferation; positive regulation of gene expression; positive regulation of myoblast differentiation; cartilage morphogenesis; embryonic viscerocranium morphogenesis; ventricular cardiac muscle cell differentiation; cellular response to lipopolysaccharide; skeletal muscle tissue development; regulation of megakaryocyte differentiation; positive regulation of transcription by RNA polymerase II; transcription by RNA polymerase II; negative regulation of blood vessel endothelial cell migration; negative regulation of vascular associated smooth muscle cell proliferation; negative regulation of vascular associated smooth muscle cell migration; negative regulation of vascular endothelial cell proliferation
Sources:Amigo / QuickGO
Orthologs
Databases	NCBI: entry; OMA: entry
Species	Human	Mouse
Entrez	4208	17260
Ensembl	ENSG00000081189	ENSMUSG00000005583
UniProt	Q06413	Q8CFN5
RefSeq (mRNA)	NM_001131005; NM_001193347; NM_001193348; NM_001193349; NM_001193350 NM_001308002; NM_002397; NM_001363581	NM_001170537; NM_025282
RefSeq (protein)	NP_001124477; NP_001180276; NP_001180277; NP_001180278; NP_001180279 NP_001294931; NP_002388; NP_001350510; NP_001351258; NP_001351259; NP_001351260; NP_001351261; NP_001351262; NP_001351263; NP_001351264; NP_001351265; NP_001351266; NP_001351267; NP_001351268; NP_001351269; NP_001351270; NP_001351271; NP_001351272; NP_001351273; NP_001351274; NP_001351275; NP_001351276; NP_001351277; NP_001351278; NP_001351279; NP_001351281; NP_001351282; NP_001351283; NP_001351284; NP_001351285; NP_001351286; NP_001294931.1	NP_001164008; NP_001334493; NP_001334495; NP_001334496; NP_001334497 NP_001334498; NP_001334500; NP_001334501; NP_001334502; NP_001334503; NP_001334504; NP_001334505; NP_001334506; NP_001334507; NP_001334508; NP_001334509; NP_001334510; NP_079558
Location (UCSC)	Chr 5: 88.72 – 88.9 Mb	n/a
PubMed search
- Wikidata
View/Edit Human	View/Edit Mouse

Myocyte-specific enhancer factor 2C also known as MADS box transcription enhancer factor 2, polypeptide C is a protein that in humans is encoded by the MEF2C gene. MEF2C is a transcription factor in the Mef2 family.

== Genomics ==
The gene is located at 5q14.3 on the minus (Crick) strand and is 200,723 bases in length. The encoded protein has 473 amino acids with a predicted molecular weight of 51.221 kilodaltons. Three isoforms have been identified. Several post translational modifications have been identified including phosphorylation on serine-59 and serine-396, sumoylation on lysine-391, acetylation on lysine-4 and proteolytic cleavage.

== Interactions ==
MEF2C has been shown to interact with:

- EP300,
- HDAC4, HDAC7, HDAC9,
- MAPK7,
- SOX18
- SP1, and
- TEAD1.
- SETD1A

== Biological significance ==
This gene is involved in cardiac morphogenesis and myogenesis and vascular development. It may also be involved in neurogenesis and in the development of cortical architecture. Mice without a functional copy of the Mef2c gene die before birth and have abnormalities in the heart and vascular system. It is one of the targets of an oncomiR, MIRN21.

In humans mutations of this gene result in autosomal dominant mental retardation 20 (MRD20), characterised by severe psychomotor impairment, periodic tremor and an abnormal motor pattern with mirror movement of the upper limbs observed during infancy, hypotonia, abnormal EEG, epilepsy, absence of speech, autistic behavior, bruxism, and mild dysmorphic features, mild thinning of the corpus callosum and delay of white matter myelination in the occipital lobes

MEF2C-binding site is associated with minor allele of SNP rs630923, associated with the risk of multiple sclerosis, and responsible for reduced CXCR5 gene promoter activity in B-cells during activation, that could lead to decreased autoimmune response

== See also ==
- Mef2
