= Dimethylaminoisopropanol =

Names
- IUPAC name 1-(Dimethylamino)propan-2-ol
- Other names 1-Dimethylamino-2-propanol; N,N-Dimethylisopropanolamine; Dimepranol (INN)

Identifiers
CAS Number	108-16-7
3D model (JSmol)	Interactive image
ChemSpider	34412
ECHA InfoCard	100.003.234
EC Number	203-556-4
PubChem CID	37511
UNII	OX17195H4T
CompTox Dashboard (EPA)	DTXSID5031210
- InChI: InChI=1S/C5H13NO/c1-5(7)4-6(2)3/h5,7H,4H2,1-3H3 Key: NCXUNZWLEYGQAH-UHFFFAOYSA-N
- SMILES: CC(CN(C)C)O

Properties
Chemical formula	C_{5}H_{13}NO
Molar mass	103.165 g·mol^{−1}
Appearance	Clear to light yellow liquid
Density	0.837 g/mL
Melting point	−40 °C (−40 °F; 233 K)
Boiling point	121–127 °C (250–261 °F; 394–400 K)
Solubility in water	Miscible

Hazards
- Lethal dose or concentration (LD, LC)
LD_{50} (median dose)	1360 mg/kg (oral, rat)
- Except where otherwise noted, data are given for materials in their standard state (at 25 °C [77 °F], 100 kPa). Infobox references

Dimethylaminoisopropanol is a chemical compound with the molecular formula C_{5}H_{13}NO that is classified as an amino alcohol. It is used as a building block in organic synthesis. Under the name dimepranol, it is also used as an active ingredient in some pharmaceutical formulations such as inosine pranobex.
