= N-Acetylanthranilic acid =

N-acetylanthranilic Acid
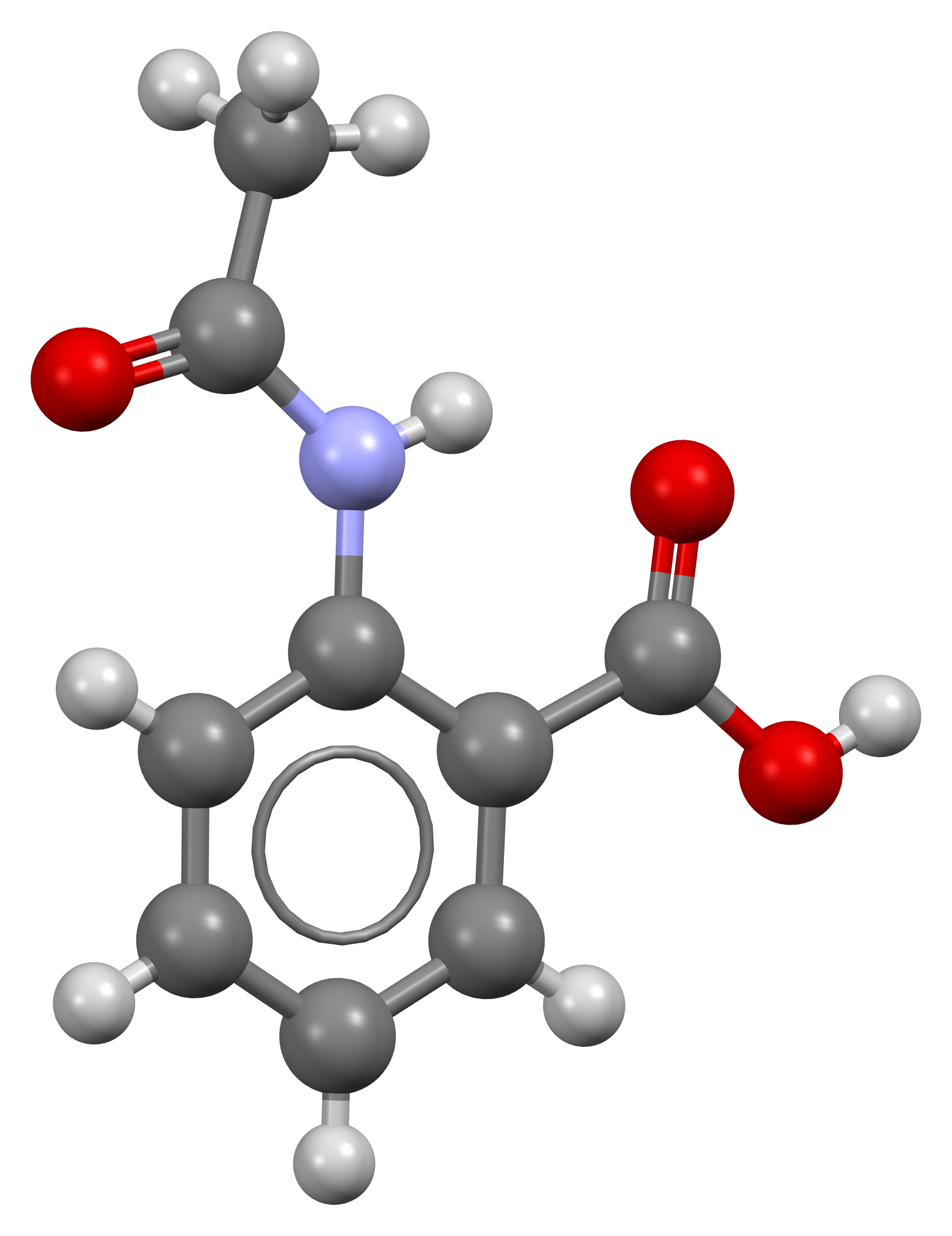
Ball-and-stick model of N-Acetylanthranilic acid

Names
- Preferred IUPAC name 2-Acetamidobenzoic acid
- Other names 2-Acetamidobenzoic acid; 2-Carboxyacetanilide; o-Acetoaminobenozic acid; Acetylanthranilic acid; 2-(Acetylamino)benzoic acid

Identifiers
CAS Number	89-52-1
3D model (JSmol)	Interactive image
ChEBI	CHEBI:36555
ChemSpider	6705
ECHA InfoCard	100.001.741
PubChem CID	6971
UNII	P1IE9J75C2
CompTox Dashboard (EPA)	DTXSID9058991
- InChI: InChI=1S/C9H9NO3/c1-6(11)10-8-5-3-2-4-7(8)9(12)13/h2-5H,1H3,(H,10,11)(H,12,13) Key: QSACCXVHEVWNMX-UHFFFAOYSA-N; InChI=1/C9H9NO3/c1-6(11)10-8-5-3-2-4-7(8)9(12)13/h2-5H,1H3,(H,10,11)(H,12,13) Key: QSACCXVHEVWNMX-UHFFFAOYAX
- SMILES: CC(=O)NC1=CC=CC=C1C(=O)O

Properties
Chemical formula	C_{9}H_{9}NO_{3}
Molar mass	179.175 g·mol^{−1}
Appearance	Slightly beige solid
Density	1.36 g/mL
Melting point	184 to 186 °C (363 to 367 °F; 457 to 459 K)
Boiling point	399 °C (750 °F; 672 K)

Hazards
- GHS labelling
Pictograms	(GHS07: Exclamation mark)
- Lethal dose or concentration (LD, LC)
LD_{50} (median dose)	Oral, mouse = 1114 mg/kg
Safety data sheet (SDS)	-
Legal status	BR: Class D1 (Drug precursors)
- Except where otherwise noted, data are given for materials in their standard state (at 25 °C [77 °F], 100 kPa). verify (what is ?) Infobox references

N-Acetylanthranilic acid is an organic compound with the molecular formula C_{9}H_{9}NO_{3}. It is an intermediate product in catabolism of quinaldine in Arthrobacter sp., and is further metabolized to anthranilic acid.

N-Acetylanthranilic acid can be synthesized from 2-bromoacetanilide via palladium-catalyzed carbonylation in tri-n-butylamine-water at 110–130 °C, under 3 atm of carbon monoxide. In the laboratory, it can be easily synthesized from anthranilic acid and acetic anhydride.

N-Acetylanthranilic acid exhibits triboluminescence when crushed. The fractured crystals have large electrical potentials between areas of high and low charge. When the electrons suddenly migrate to neutralize these potentials, flashes of deep blue light are created.

In the United States, it is a Drug Enforcement Administration-controlled List I chemical, because it has been used in the synthesis of methaqualone.

== See also ==
- Acedoben
