= MEF2D =

Protein-coding gene in humans

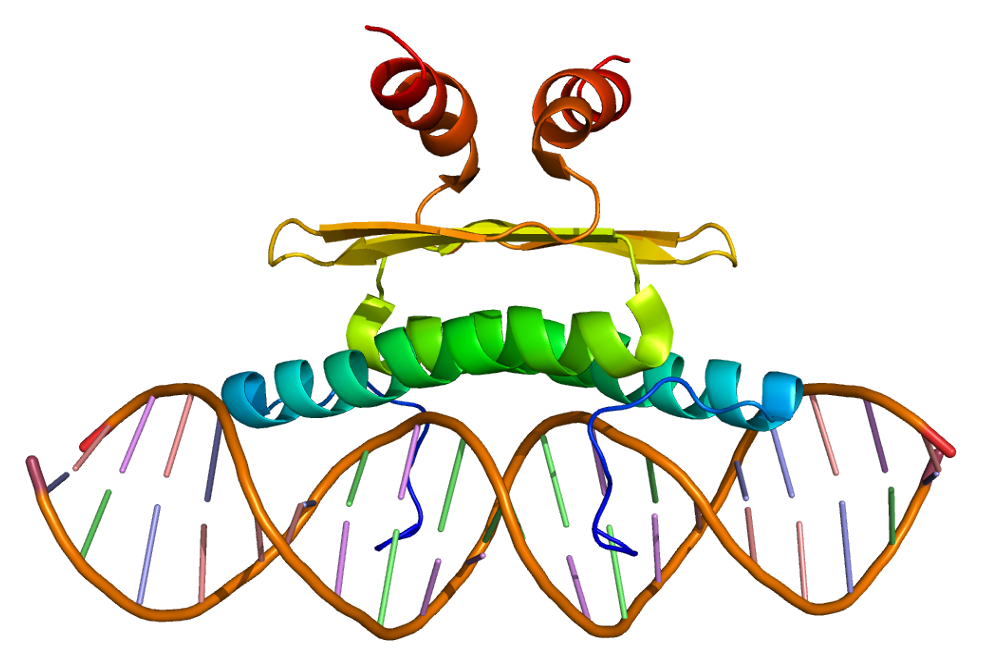

Identifiers
- Aliases: MEF2D, myocyte enhancer factor 2D
- External IDs: OMIM: 600663; MGI: 99533; GeneCards: MEF2D

Gene location (Human)
Chr.	Chromosome 1 (human)
Band	1q22	Start	156,463,727 bp
Band	1q22	End	156,500,779 bp

Gene location (Mouse)
Chr.	Chromosome 3 (mouse)
Band	3 F1|3 38.78 cM	Start	88,049,679 bp
Band	3 F1|3 38.78 cM	End	88,079,393 bp
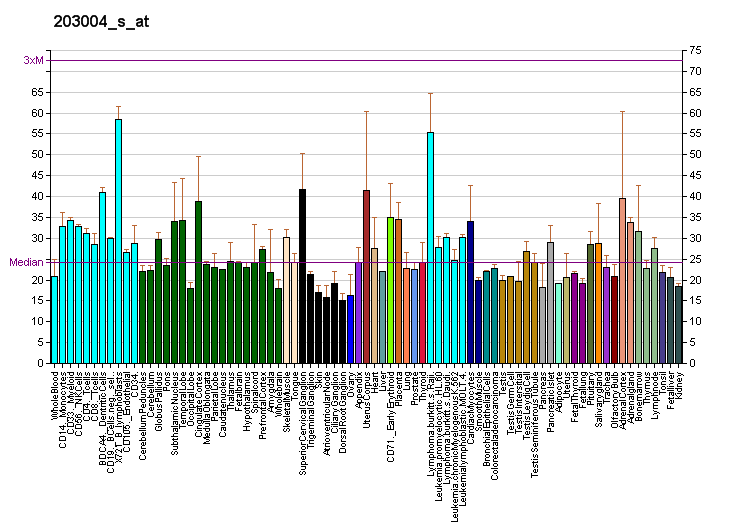

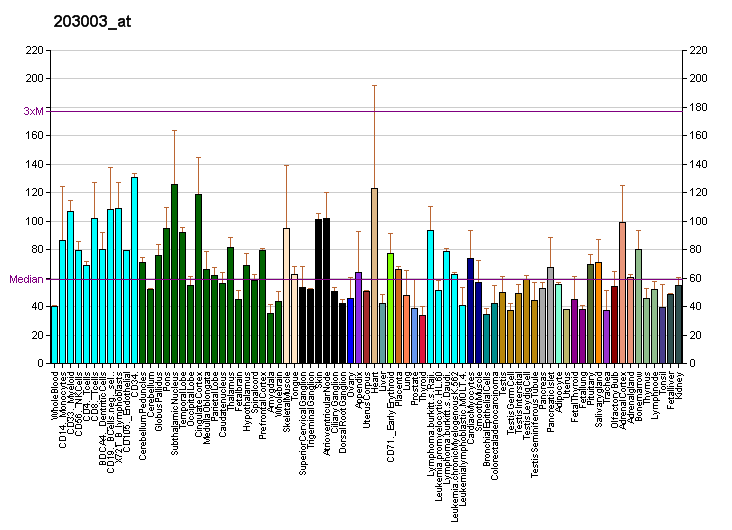
RNA expression pattern
Bgee	Human / Mouse (ortholog); Top expressed in: muscle of thigh; gastrocnemius muscle; popliteal artery; tibial arteries; saphenous vein; apex of heart; sural nerve; gastric mucosa; canal of the cervix; right coronary artery / Top expressed in: Ileal epithelium; neural layer of retina; perirhinal cortex; entorhinal cortex; CA3 field; muscle of thigh; dentate gyrus of hippocampal formation granule cell; superior frontal gyrus; plantaris muscle; primary visual cortex; More reference expression data
BioGPS	More reference expression data
Gene ontology
Molecular function	DNA binding; protein dimerization activity; protein homodimerization activity; DNA-binding transcription factor activity; DNA-binding transcription activator activity, RNA polymerase II-specific; histone deacetylase binding; RNA polymerase II cis-regulatory region sequence-specific DNA binding; protein binding; protein heterodimerization activity; enzyme binding; RNA polymerase II transcription regulatory region sequence-specific DNA binding; DNA-binding transcription factor activity, RNA polymerase II-specific
Cellular component	cytoplasm; intracellular membrane-bounded organelle; nucleoplasm; nucleus
Biological process	cell differentiation; regulation of transcription, DNA-templated; chondrocyte differentiation; adult heart development; muscle organ development; endochondral ossification; transcription by RNA polymerase II; transcription, DNA-templated; nervous system development; multicellular organism development; positive regulation of transcription, DNA-templated; osteoblast differentiation; skeletal muscle cell differentiation; positive regulation of transcription by RNA polymerase II; apoptotic process; positive regulation of vascular associated smooth muscle cell proliferation
Sources:Amigo / QuickGO
Orthologs
Databases	NCBI: entry; OMA: entry
Species	Human	Mouse
Entrez	4209	17261
Ensembl	ENSG00000116604	ENSMUSG00000001419
UniProt	Q14814	Q63943
RefSeq (mRNA)	NM_001271629; NM_005920	NM_133665; NM_001310587; NM_001310593
RefSeq (protein)	NP_001258558; NP_005911	NP_001297516; NP_001297522; NP_598426
Location (UCSC)	Chr 1: 156.46 – 156.5 Mb	Chr 3: 88.05 – 88.08 Mb
PubMed search
- Wikidata
View/Edit Human	View/Edit Mouse

Myocyte-specific enhancer factor 2D is a protein that in humans is encoded by the MEF2D gene.

== Interactions ==
MEF2D has been shown to interact with:

- CABIN1,
- EP300,
- MAPK7,
- Myocyte-specific enhancer factor 2A,
- NFATC2
- Sp1 transcription factor, and
- YWHAQ.

== See also ==
- Mef2
