= HDAC4 =

Protein found in humans

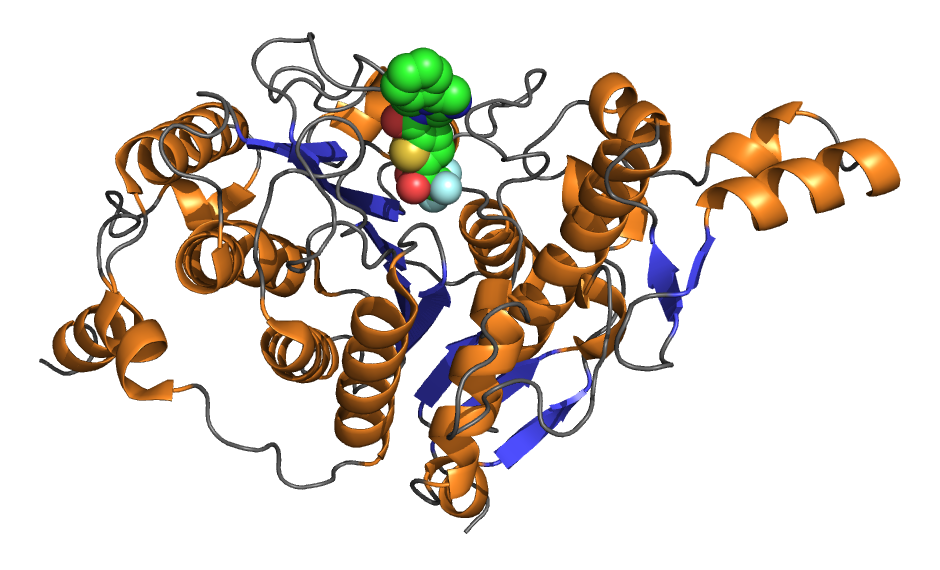

Identifiers
- Aliases: HDAC4, AHO3, BDMR, HA6116, HD4, HDAC-4, HDAC-A, HDACA, histone deacetylase 4, NEDCHID
- External IDs: OMIM: 605314; MGI: 3036234; GeneCards: HDAC4
Available structures
PDB	Ortholog search: PDBe RCSB
PDB	List of PDB id codes 2H8N, 2O94, 2VQJ, 2VQM, 2VQO, 2VQQ, 2VQV, 2VQW, 3UXG, 3UZD, 3V31, 4CBT, 4CBY, 5A2S
Enzyme activity
EC #	BRENDA	ExPASy	KEGG	MetaCyc
3.5.1.98	↗	↗	↗	↗

Gene location (Human)
Chr.	Chromosome 2 (human)
Band	2q37.3	Start	239,048,168 bp
Band	2q37.3	End	239,401,654 bp

Gene location (Mouse)
Chr.	Chromosome 1 (mouse)
Band	1|1 D	Start	91,856,501 bp
Band	1|1 D	End	92,123,421 bp
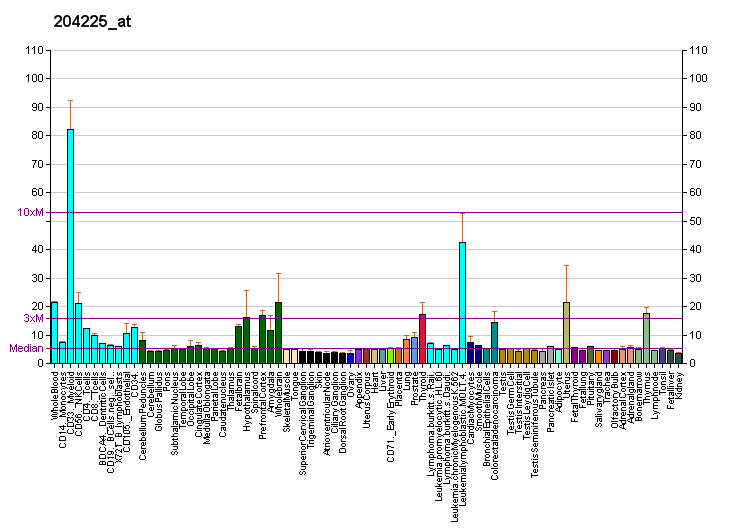
RNA expression pattern
Bgee	Human / Mouse (ortholog); Top expressed in: sural nerve; glutes; gastrocnemius muscle; tibialis anterior muscle; muscle of thigh; muscle layer of sigmoid colon; endothelial cell; deltoid muscle; Skeletal muscle tissue of biceps brachii; blood / Top expressed in: otic vesicle; granulocyte; gastrula; Rostral migratory stream; dentate gyrus of hippocampal formation granule cell; muscle of thigh; lip; interventricular septum; muscle tissue; skeletal muscle tissue; More reference expression data
BioGPS	More reference expression data
Gene ontology
Molecular function	NAD-dependent histone deacetylase activity (H3-K14 specific); sequence-specific DNA binding; DNA binding; transcription corepressor activity; histone deacetylase activity; zinc ion binding; transcription factor binding; histone deacetylase binding; potassium ion binding; chromatin binding; metal ion binding; protein binding; protein kinase binding; hydrolase activity; protein deacetylase activity; identical protein binding; promoter-specific chromatin binding; RNA polymerase II cis-regulatory region sequence-specific DNA binding; SUMO transferase activity
Cellular component	cytoplasm; histone deacetylase complex; neuromuscular junction; transcription repressor complex; sarcomere; Z discdkac; A band; actomyosin; nucleus; cytosol; nucleoplasm; protein-containing complex
Biological process	positive regulation of reactive oxygen species biosynthetic process; histone H3 deacetylation; skeletal system development; chromatin remodeling; peptidyl-lysine deacetylation; regulation of cardiac muscle contraction by calcium ion signaling; negative regulation of glycolytic process; response to interleukin-1; regulation of transcription, DNA-templated; regulation of gene expression, epigenetic; cellular response to tumor necrosis factor; positive regulation of DNA-binding transcription factor activity; negative regulation of transcription by RNA polymerase II; positive regulation of protein sumoylation; negative regulation of DNA-binding transcription factor activity; negative regulation of osteoblast differentiation; transcription, DNA-templated; nervous system development; regulation of striated muscle cell differentiation; positive regulation of transcription, DNA-templated; positive regulation of smooth muscle cell migration; B cell activation; histone H4 deacetylation; cellular response to mechanical stimulus; positive regulation of neuron apoptotic process; cardiac muscle hypertrophy in response to stress; positive regulation of cell population proliferation; negative regulation of myotube differentiation; response to denervation involved in regulation of muscle adaptation; regulation of skeletal muscle fiber development; osteoblast development; B cell differentiation; cellular response to parathyroid hormone stimulus; inflammatory response; positive regulation of lamellipodium assembly; regulation of protein binding; negative regulation of transcription, DNA-templated; histone deacetylation; positive regulation of transcription by RNA polymerase II; negative regulation of cell population proliferation; positive regulation of smooth muscle cell proliferation; chromatin organization; negative regulation of pri-miRNA transcription by RNA polymerase II; protein deacetylation; protein sumoylation; positive regulation of male mating behavior
Sources:Amigo / QuickGO
Orthologs
Databases	NCBI: entry; OMA: entry
Species	Human	Mouse
Entrez	9759	208727
Ensembl	ENSG00000068024	ENSMUSG00000026313
UniProt	P56524	Q6NZM9
RefSeq (mRNA)	NM_006037; NM_001378414; NM_001378415; NM_001378416; NM_001378417	NM_207225
RefSeq (protein)	NP_006028; NP_001365343; NP_001365344; NP_001365345; NP_001365346	NP_997108
Location (UCSC)	Chr 2: 239.05 – 239.4 Mb	Chr 1: 91.86 – 92.12 Mb
PubMed search
- Wikidata
View/Edit Human	View/Edit Mouse

Histone deacetylase 4, also known as HDAC4, is a protein that in humans is encoded by the HDAC4 gene.

== Function ==
Histones play a critical role in transcriptional regulation, cell cycle progression, and developmental events. Histone acetylation/deacetylation alters chromosome structure and affects transcription factor access to DNA. The protein encoded by this gene belongs to class II of the histone deacetylase/acuc/apha family. It possesses histone deacetylase activity and represses transcription when tethered to a promoter. This protein does not bind DNA directly but through transcription factors MEF2C and MEF2D. It seems to interact in a multiprotein complex with RbAp48 and HDAC3. Furthermore, HDAC4 is required for TGFbeta1-induced myofibroblastic differentiation.

== Clinical significance ==
Studies have shown that HDAC4 regulates bone and muscle development. Harvard University researchers also concluded that it promotes healthy vision: Reduced levels of the protein led to the death of the rod photoreceptors and bipolar cells in the retinas of mice.

== Interactions ==
HDAC4 has been shown to interact with:

- BCL6,
- BTG2,
- CBX5,
- GATA1,
- HDAC3,
- MAPK1,
- MAPK3,
- MEF2C,
- Myocyte-specific enhancer factor 2A,
- Nuclear receptor co-repressor 1,
- Nuclear receptor co-repressor 2,
- Testicular receptor 2,
- YWHAB,
- YWHAE, and
- Zinc finger and BTB domain-containing protein 16.

== See also ==
- Histone deacetylase
