= STAR syndrome =

- Other names: Syndactyly with renal and anogenital malformation
- Diagram showing X-linked dominant inheritance scenarios for the mother being affected
- Specialty: Genetics
- Symptoms: Syndactyly, telecanthus, anogenital malformations, renal malformations, and short stature
- Usual onset: Birth
- Diagnostic method: Clinical features and genetic testing
- Differential diagnosis: VATER syndrome
- Frequency: Fewer than 100 documented cases

STAR syndrome is an extremely rare X-linked dominant syndrome that is caused by single FAM58A gene point mutations or deletions of FAM58A and its flanking genes.

STAR syndrome is distinguished by a variety of facial dysmorphisms and malformations outlined by its acronym: Syndactyly, Telecanthus, and Anogenital and Renal malformations.

== Signs and symptoms ==
The name STAR stands for the syndrome's primary signs and symptoms:

Syndactyly Telecanthus Anogenital malformations Renal malformations.

Other bone abnormalities, hearing loss, epilepsy, retinal abnormalities, syringomyelia, tethered spinal cord, and several other birth defects have been documented in STAR syndrome.

Ocular signs include telecanthus and eyelid abnormalities, as well as peripheral anterior synechiae in the anterior segment. Retinal findings such as macular drusen and macular hypoplasia have also been identified.

== Causes ==
STAR syndrome is caused by either point mutations or deletions of the FAM58A gene, which is located on chromosome Xq28. This gene encodes Cyclin M, a Cyclin-dependent kinase 10 (CDK10) binding partner. The Cyclin M/CDK10 interactions regulate the division of cells and development by suppressing ETS2-driven MAPK pathway activation. Cyclin M/CDK10 interaction has been demonstrated to be defective in STAR syndrome patients. The abnormalities of the FAM58A gene in STAR syndrome suggest that it is X-linked dominant. Since STAR syndrome has only been observed in female patients it is most likely lethal in males.
