= Constitutive heterochromatin =

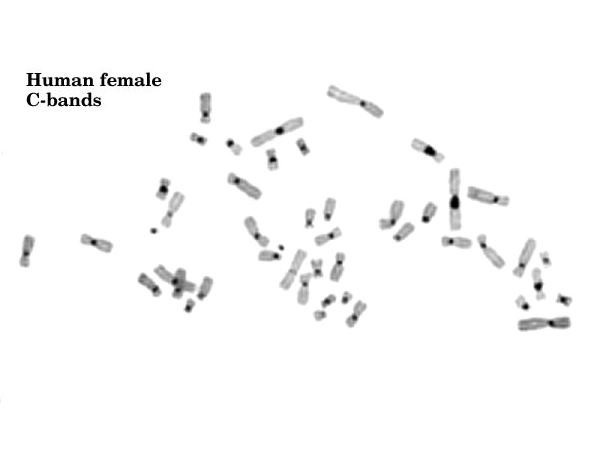
C-banding of a human female karyotype showing constitutive heterochromatin

Constitutive heterochromatin domains are regions of DNA found throughout the chromosomes of eukaryotes. The majority of constitutive heterochromatin is found at the pericentromeric regions of chromosomes, but is also found at the telomeres and throughout the chromosomes. In humans there is significantly more constitutive heterochromatin found on chromosomes 1, 9, 16, 19 and Y. Constitutive heterochromatin is composed mainly of high copy number tandem repeats known as satellite repeats, minisatellite and microsatellite repeats, and transposon repeats. In humans these regions account for about 200Mb or 6.5% of the total human genome. Their repeat composition made them difficult to sequence, but a full sequence was finally published in 2022.

Visualization of constitutive heterochromatin is possible by using the C-banding technique. The regions that stain darker are regions of constitutive heterochromatin. The constitutive heterochromatin stains darker because of the highly condensed nature of the DNA.

Constitutive heterochromatin is not to be confused with facultative heterochromatin, which is less condensed, less stable, and much less polymorphic, and which does not stain when using the C-banding technique.

== Function ==
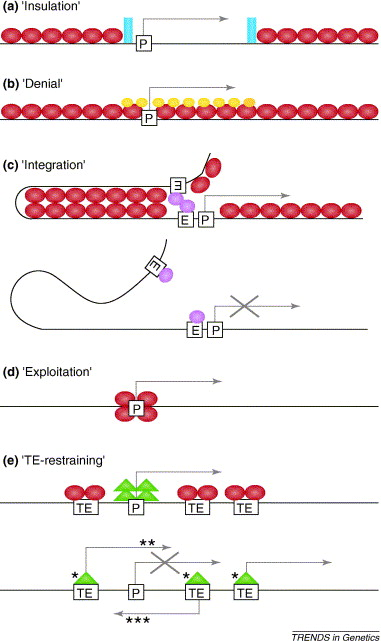
Possible models for expression of genes found in constitutive heterochromatin.

Heterochromatin vs. euchromatin

Constitutive heterochromatin is found more commonly in the periphery of the nucleus attached to the nuclear membrane. This concentrates the euchromatic DNA in the center of the nucleus where it can be actively transcribed. During mitosis it is believed that constitutive heterochromatin is necessary for proper segregation of sister chromatids and centromere function. The repeat sequences found at the pericentromeres are not conserved throughout many species and depend more on epigenetic modifications for regulation, while telomeres show more conserved sequences.

Constitutive heterochromatin was thought to be relatively devoid of genes, but researchers have found more than 450 genes in the heterochromatic DNA of Drosophila melanogaster. These regions are highly condensed and epigenetically modified to prevent transcription. For the genes to be transcribed, they must have a mechanism to overcome the silencing that occurs in the rest of the heterochromatin. There are many proposed models for how the genes in these regions are expressed, including the insulation, denial, integration, exploitation, and TE restraining models.

When genes are placed near a region of constitutive heterochromatin, their transcription is usually silenced. This is known as position-effect variegation and can lead to a mosaic phenotype.

== Replication and epigenetics ==
General model for duplication of heterochromatin during cell division

Constitutive heterochromatin is replicated late in S phase of the cell cycle and does not participate in meiotic recombination.

Histone modifications are one of the main ways that the cell condenses constitutive heterochromatin. The three most common modifications in constitutive heterochromatin are histone hypoacetylation, histone H3-Lys9 methylation (H3K9), and cytosine methylation. These modifications are also found in other types of DNA, but much less frequently. Cytosine methylation is the most common type, although it is not found in all eukaryotes. In humans there is increased methylation at the centromeres and telomeres, which are composed of constitutive heterochromatin. These modifications can persist through both mitosis and meiosis and are heritable.

SUV39H1 is a histone methyltransferase that methylates H3K9, providing a binding site for heterochromatin protein 1 (HP1). HP1 is involved in the chromatin condensing process that makes DNA inaccessible for transcription.

== Diseases ==
Genetic disorders that result from mutations involving the constitutive heterochromatin tend to affect cell differentiation and are inherited in an autosomal recessive pattern. Disorders include Roberts syndrome and ICF syndrome.

Some cancers are associated with anomalies in constitutive heterochromatin and the proteins involved in its formation and maintenance. Breast cancer is linked to a decrease in the HP1 alpha protein, while non-Hodgkin's lymphoma is linked to hypomethylation of the genome and especially of satellite regions.
