= Zinc finger protein 280D =

Protein-coding gene in the species Homo sapiens

ZNF280D

Identifiers
- Aliases: ZNF280D, SUHW4, ZNF634, zinc finger protein 280D
- External IDs: MGI: 2384583; GeneCards: ZNF280D

Gene location (Mouse)
Chr.	Chromosome 9 (mouse)
Band	9|9 D	Start	72,182,142 bp
Band	9|9 D	End	72,271,059 bp
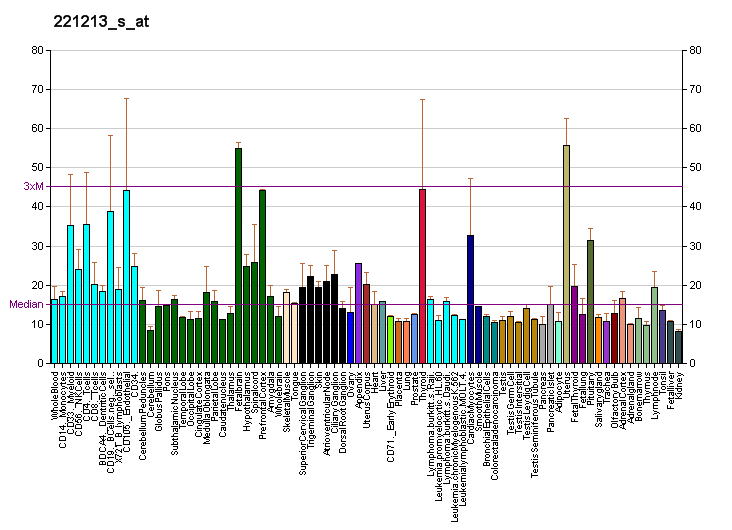
RNA expression pattern
Bgee	Human / Mouse (ortholog); n/a / Top expressed in: genital tubercle; tail of embryo; zygote; thymus; Rostral migratory stream; pineal gland; ganglionic eminence; secondary oocyte; superior cervical ganglion; anterior amygdaloid area
BioGPS	More reference expression data
Gene ontology
Molecular function	DNA binding; metal ion binding; nucleic acid binding; DNA-binding transcription factor activity, RNA polymerase II-specific; DNA-binding transcription factor activity
Cellular component	nucleus
Biological process	transcription, DNA-templated; regulation of transcription, DNA-templated; regulation of transcription by RNA polymerase II
Sources:Amigo / QuickGO
Orthologs
Databases	NCBI: entry; OMA: entry
Species	Human	Mouse
Entrez	54816	235469
Ensembl	ENSG00000137871	ENSMUSG00000038535
UniProt	Q6N043	Q68FE8
RefSeq (mRNA)	NM_001002843; NM_001002844; NM_001288588; NM_001288589; NM_017661	NM_146224; NM_001311105
RefSeq (protein)	NP_001002843; NP_001002844; NP_001275517; NP_001275518; NP_060131	NP_001298034; NP_666336
Location (UCSC)	n/a	Chr 9: 72.18 – 72.27 Mb
PubMed search
- Wikidata
View/Edit Human	View/Edit Mouse

Zinc finger protein 280D, also known as Suppressor Of Hairy Wing Homolog 4, SUWH4, Zinc Finger Protein 634, ZNF634, or KIAA1584, is a protein that in humans is encoded by the ZNF280D gene located on chromosome 15q21.3.

== Gene ==
There are a total of 24 possible exons in any variant of the ZNF280D gene. ZNF280D is oriented on the minus strand of Chromosome 15 and spans 288.396 kb. Surrounding genes at the same locus include TEX9, HMGB1P33, MNS1, LOC645877, and LOC145783.

Chromosomal location of the ZNF280D gene in humans with surrounding local genes

Chromosome 15 Location

== mRNA ==
At least 24 spliced variants have been identified. There are 7 probable alternative promoters. The mRNAs appear to differ by truncation of the 5' end, truncation of the 3' end, presence or absence of 12 cassette exons, overlapping exons with different boundaries, splicing versus retention of 5 introns. The longest splice form contains 4428 bp.

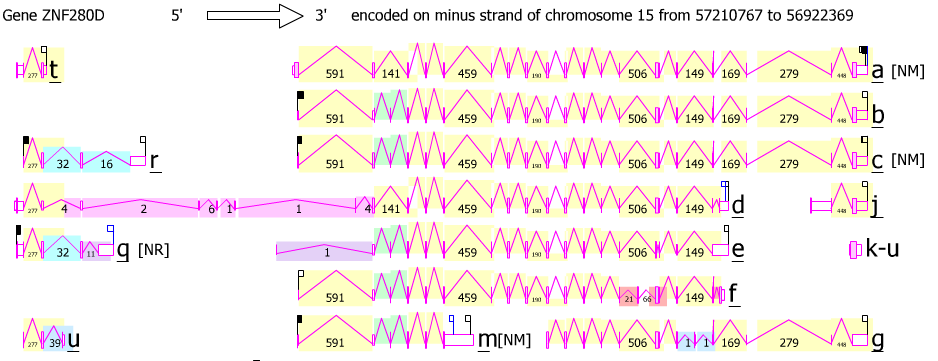
Most abundant alternative splice forms of ZNF280D mRNA.

== Protein ==
=== Composition and Domains ===
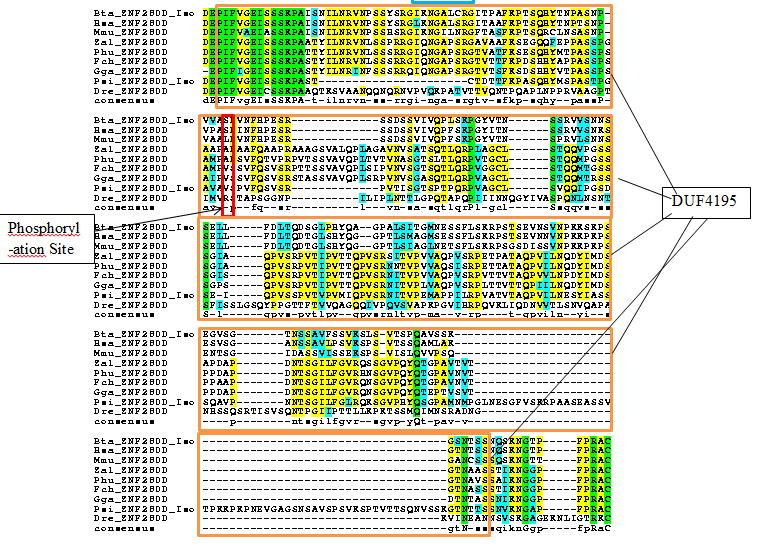
Multiple sequence alignment of orthologs for DUF4195 reveals low conservation.

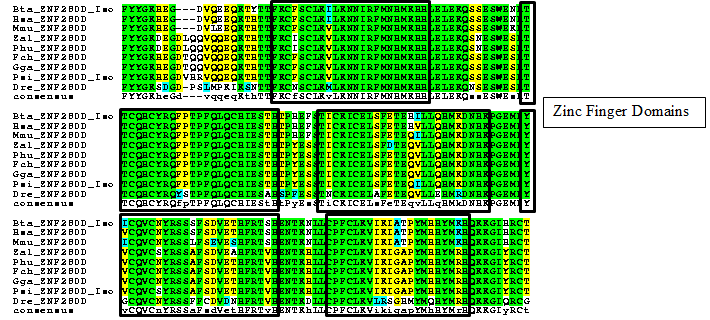
Multiple sequence alignment of orthologs for five zinc finger domains reveals high conservation.

The ZNF280D protein is 979 amino acids in length. The protein contains a domain of unknown function (DUF4195) spanning from amino acid 45 to amino acid 230. DUF4195 (pfam13826) is a family that is found at the N-terminus of metazoan proteins that carry PHD-like zinc-finger domains; the function is unknown. ZNF280D protein also contains five highly conserved Cys2His2-type zinc finger domains. Zinc fingers have the ability to bind DNA, which supports the speculative role of ZNF280D as a transcription factor. The protein has a weight of approximately 109.3 kdal. Charge cluster analysis reveals a negative charge cluster near the N-terminus from amino acids 16-43. Charge clusters are associated with functional domains of cellular transcription factors, providing further support for ZNF280D as a possible transcription factor.

=== Interactions ===
ZNF280D has been experimentally determined to interact with CBX5 and CBX3 proteins. These proteins both play a role in the formation of heterochromatin, which presents a possible functional role of ZNF280D as a transcriptional repressor.

=== SNPs ===
There are a number of SNPs that have been observed in the human population. The image below lists some of the most frequently occurring.

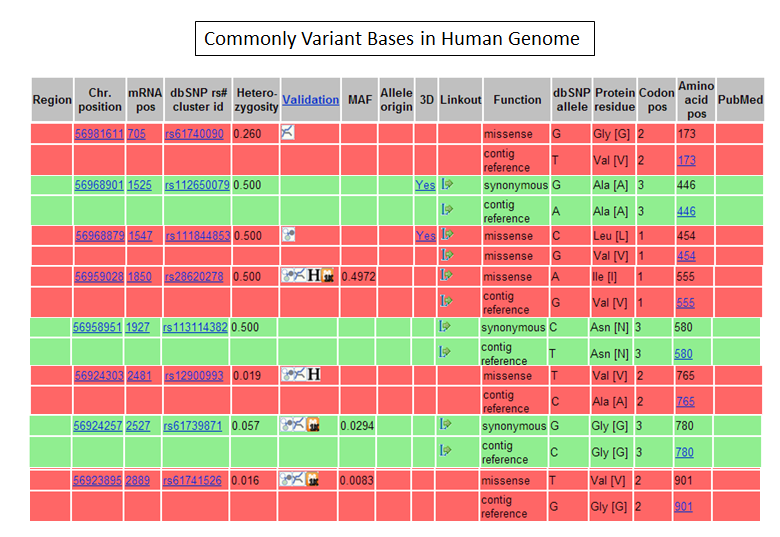
Frequently observed SNPs in human genome.

== Regulation ==
=== mRNA Level ===
Human ZNF280D promoter region and predicted transcription factor binding sites.

A number of transcription factors are predicted to bind to the predicted promoter region.

=== Protein Level ===
ZNF280D protein contains 66 serine, 17 threonine, and 6 tyrosine residues all of which are potential phosphorylation sites.

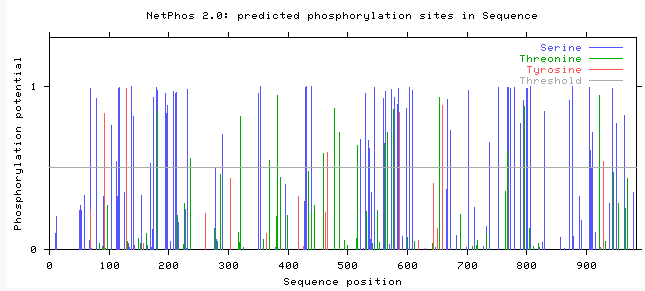
Candidate phosphorylation sites in human ZNF280D protein.

The glycine residue at position 2 is a probable candidate for N-terminal acetylation. There are seven probable sumoylation sites.

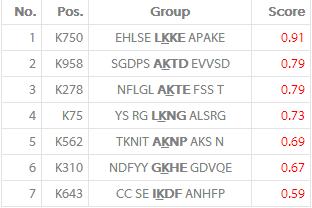
Probable sumoylation sites in ZNF280D protein.

== Expression ==
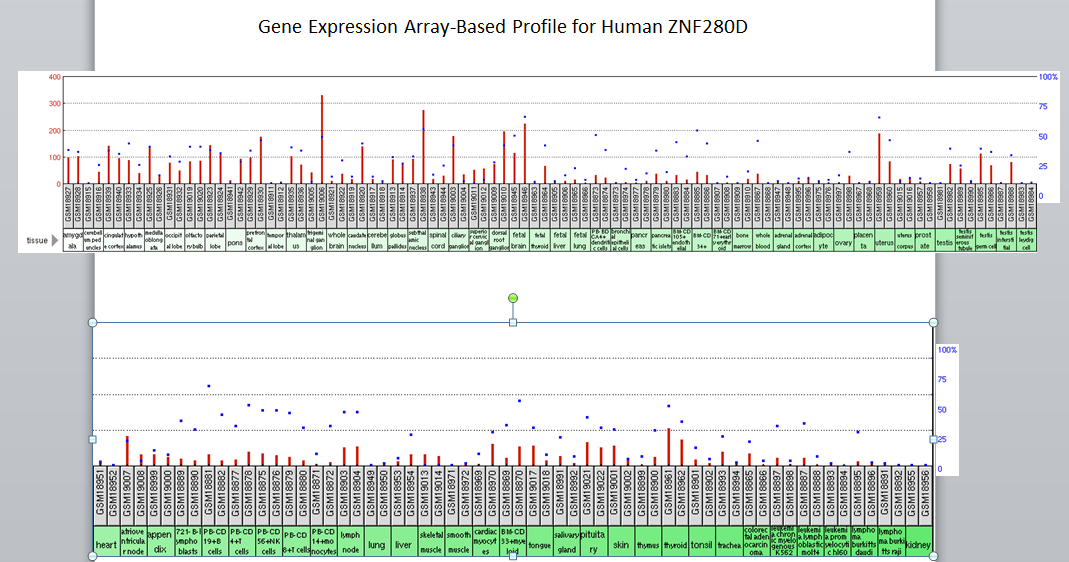
GEO Profile expression analysis of ZNF280D protein in human tissues.

ZNF280D is ubiquitously expressed at relatively low levels throughout almost all tissues in the human body.

In one study, the expression of ZNF280D was compared between endothelial progenitor cells in cord blood and peripheral blood. The results show that expression was significantly higher in cord blood. This supports a possible involvement of ZNF280D in embryonic development or cell differentiation.

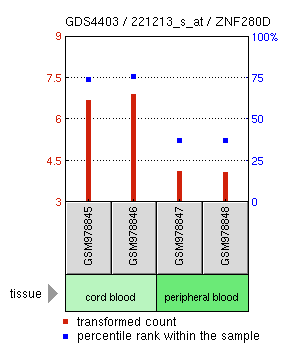
Expression data for ZNF280D in endothelial progenitor cells from cord blood and adult peripheral blood.

== Evolution ==
A number of orthologs and distant homologs have been identified for the human ZNF280D protein. There are also four paralogs to ZNF280D in the human genome.

Table of select number of orthologs and distant homologs for human ZNF280D protein
Protein Name	Species	Date of Divergence (Million Years Ago)	Accession number	Sequence length (# amino acids)	Sequence identity	E Value
ZNF280D	Mouse (Mus musculus)	92.3	NP_666336	974	76%	0
ZNF280D Isoform X1	Cow (Bos taurus)	94.2	XP_002690904	974	88%	0
ZNF280D	African bush elephant (Loxodonta africana)	98.7	XP_003418437	979	90%	0
ZNF280D Isoform X1	Chinese softshell turtle (Pelodiscus sinensis)	296	XP_006112544	993	61%	0
ZNF280D	Saker falcon (Falco cherrug)	296	XP_005435548	939	60%	0
ZNF280D	Ground tit (Pseudopdoces humilis)	296	XP_005521527	936	57%	0
ZNF280D Isoform X1	Chinese alligator (Alligator sinensis)	296	XP_006018037	277	50%	1E-64
ZNF280D	Western clawed frog (Xenopus tropicalis)	371.2	XP_002940298	1071	49%	0
ZNF280D Isoform X1	Zebrafish (Danio rerio)	400.1	XP_005166581	879	43%	2E-172
ZNF280D-like	Acorn worm (Saccoglossus kowalevskii)	661.2	XP_006811912	733	32%	5E-50
Zinc Finger Protein 36	Sea squirt (Ciona intestinalis)	722.5	NP_001041459	581	32%	7E-58
GL11474	Fruit fly (Drosophila persimilis)	782.7	XP_002016218	1271	29%	5E-16
Zinc Finger Protein	Eye worm (Loa loa)	937.5	XP_003139663	495	33%	6E-19
Zap1p	Yeast (Saccharomyces cerevisiae S288c)	12158	NP_012479	880	33%	2E-7

Table of paralogs for human ZNF280D protein
Paralog Name	Accession number	Sequence length (# amino acids)	Sequence identity	E Value
ZNF280C	NP_060136	737	68%	0
ZNF280B	NP_542942	543	54%	0
ZNF280A	NP_542778	542	49%	6E-148
ZNF280E (pogo transposable element with ZNF domain isoform 1)	NP_055915	1410	44%	4E-134
