= Ki-67 =

Ki-67 may refer to:

- Mitsubishi Ki-67, a Japanese bomber used during World War II
- Ki-67 (protein), Proliferation marker
