= Putative uncharacterized protein C6orf52 =

Protein in humans

C6orf52

Identifiers
- Aliases: C6orf52, chromosome 6 open reading frame 52
- External IDs: HomoloGene: 129985; GeneCards: C6orf52; OMA:C6orf52 - orthologs

Gene location (Human)
Chr.	Chromosome 6 (human)
Band	6p24.2	Start	10,671,418 bp
Band	6p24.2	End	10,694,797 bp
RNA expression pattern
Bgee	Human / Mouse (ortholog); Top expressed in: testicle; right testis; left testis; right uterine tube; gonad; olfactory zone of nasal mucosa; duodenum; islet of Langerhans; ganglionic eminence; hypothalamus / n/a; More reference expression data
BioGPS	n/a
Orthologs
Species	Human	Mouse
Entrez	347744	n/a
Ensembl	ENSG00000137434; ENSG00000285312	n/a
UniProt	Q5T4I8	n/a
RefSeq (mRNA)	NM_001145020; NM_001354357; NM_001388310; NM_001388311	n/a
RefSeq (protein)	NP_001138492; NP_001341286	n/a
Location (UCSC)	Chr 6: 10.67 – 10.69 Mb	n/a
PubMed search		n/a
- Wikidata
View/Edit Human

Putative uncharacterized protein C6orf52 (C6orf52) is a protein in humans that is encoded by the gene "C6orf52" and has six known isoforms. C6orf52 was identified in 2002 by The National Institutes of Health Mammalian Gene Collection (MGC) Program. C6orf52 has one known paralog, tRNA selenocysteine 1-associated protein 1 (TRNAU1AP).

== Gene ==
The cytogenetic location of C6orf52 is 6p24.2 on the shorthand of chromosome 6. It is 23,379 nucleotides long, spanning from nucleotide 10671418 to 10694797 and has a molecular weight of 17,383 Da with 9 different exons. C6orf52 has no common aliases although the major protein product is sometimes referred to as "Q5T4I8".

Location of C6orf52 on shorthand of chromosome 6.

== mRNA ==
C6orf52 is known to undergo alternative splicing and has six known isoforms of varying length.

== Homology ==
=== Paralogs ===
C6orf52 has one identified paralog, tRNA selenocysteine 1-associated protein 1 (TRNAU1AP), which is located on chromosome one at 1p35.3. TRNAU1AP is involved selenocysteine biosynthesis, selenoproteins synthesis efficiency enhancement and may be involved in the methylation of tRNA(Sec).

=== Orthologs ===
C6orf52 is conserved through many species. It can be found it many mammals, reptiles, and birds, such as the Zebra Finch.

Scientific name	Name	Accession	Sequence Similarity %	Date of Divergence (Estimated MYA)
Sus scrofa	Wild Boar	NP_001138494.1	60.976	96
Taeniopygia guttata	Zebra Finch	XP_004175377.1	56.90	312
Ailuropoda melanoleuca	Giant Panda	XP_019651607.1	64.43	96
Pelodiscus sinensis	Chinese Softshell Turtle	XP_006138812.1	42.55	312
Canis lupus familiaris	Dog	XP_005640089.1	64.29	96
Pan troglodytes	Common Chimpanzee	XP_009448762.2	98.03	6.65
Macaca mulatta	Rhesus macaque	NP_001180810.1	94.08	29.44

There is a domain of high conservation across species starting near the last third of the polypeptide.

Multiple sequence alignment for multiple orthologs of C6orf52. A high conservation domain begins near the last third of the polypeptide sequence.

== Isoforms ==
Q5T4I8 has six known isoforms of varying amino acid length.

Isoform	Polypeptide Length
X1	207
X2	182
X3	177
X4	176
X5	126
X6	93

== Tissue distribution ==
Tissue expression is highest within the oocyte, with high expression in the testes and female gonad.

Tissue expression of Q5T4I8 in humans. Expression is highest in the oocyte.

Expression is extremely high (2000-3000 transcripts per million) in the first stages of embryonic development up until the blastocyst.

C6orf52 expression levels during preimplantation embryonic development, measured in transcripts per million (TPM)

== Subcellular localization ==
It is predicted to be a non-transmembrane protein that is located within the nucleus.

== Structure ==
The protein composition is relatively high in glutamic acid and serine residue levels and is relatively low in tryptophan and arginine when compared to the average human protein composition.

The secondary structure of C6orf52 consists mostly of coiled regions, however there is an extended alpha helix region within the highly conserved domain.

== Post-translational modifications ==
C6orf52 has two commonly predicted post-translational modifications present in the highly conserved domain. The lysine at position 123 (of the major protein) within the highly conserved domain is expected to undergo sumoylation often, while the tyrosine at position 128 is expected to undergo phosphorylation. Sumoylation sites allow for the binding of SUMO (small ubiquitin-like modifier protein) which are known to alter different functional parameters of proteins such as subcellular localization, protein parenting, DNA binding and transactivation functions of transcription factors. Tyrosine phosphorylation is associated with many things, namely growth factor signaling and cell differentiation during development which are recurring aspects of C6orf52.

== Clinical significance ==
Two proteins in cattle that have been linked to fat or energy metabolism were predicted to be similar to C6orf52, however there is no known clinical study done examining C6orf52.
