= ZMYND11 =

Protein-coding gene in the species Homo sapiens

Identifiers
- Aliases: ZMYND11, BRAM1, BS69, MRD30, zinc finger MYND-type containing 11
- External IDs: OMIM: 608668; MGI: 1913755; GeneCards: ZMYND11
Available structures
| PDB | Ortholog search: PDBe RCSB |
| PDB | List of PDB id codes 4NS5, 5HDA |

Gene location (Human)
| Chr. | Chromosome 10 (human) |
| Band | 10p15.3 | Start | 134,465 bp |
| Band | 10p15.3 | End | 254,637 bp |

Gene location (Mouse)
| Chr. | Chromosome 13 (mouse) |
| Band | 13|13 A1 | Start | 9,734,869 bp |
| Band | 13|13 A1 | End | 9,815,366 bp |
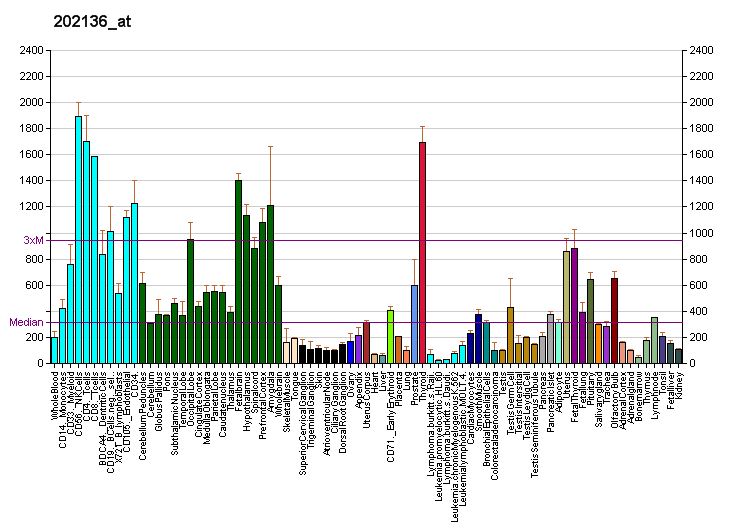

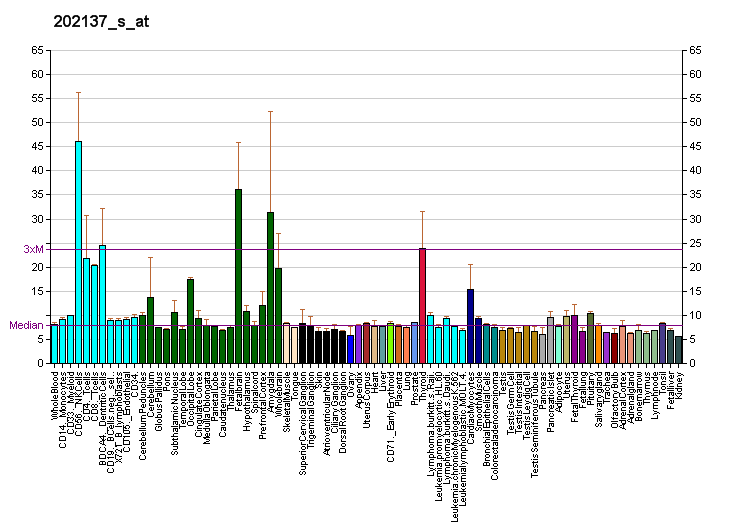
RNA expression pattern
| Bgee | Human / Mouse (ortholog); Top expressed in: optic nerve; caput epididymis; tail of epididymis; corpus epididymis; lactiferous duct; inferior ganglion of vagus nerve; corpus callosum; superior vestibular nucleus; postcentral gyrus; Brodmann area 46 / Top expressed in: ciliary body; retinal pigment epithelium; iris; barrel cortex; conjunctival fornix; ureter; Region I of hippocampus proper; substantia nigra; Epithelium of choroid plexus; medullary collecting duct; More reference expression data |
| BioGPS | More reference expression data |
Gene ontology
| Molecular function | DNA binding; RNA polymerase II transcription regulatory region sequence-specific DNA binding; chromatin binding; transcription coregulator activity; metal ion binding; protein binding; transcription corepressor activity; histone binding; double-stranded DNA binding; zinc ion binding; methylated histone binding |
| Cellular component | nucleoplasm; chromosome; nucleus |
| Biological process | regulation of transcription, DNA-templated; negative regulation of extrinsic apoptotic signaling pathway; negative regulation of I-kappaB kinase/NF-kappaB signaling; transcription, DNA-templated; negative regulation of JNK cascade; cell cycle; cell population proliferation; viral process; regulation of transcription elongation from RNA polymerase II promoter; defense response to virus; negative regulation of nucleic acid-templated transcription; chromatin organization; negative regulation of transcription, DNA-templated |
Sources:Amigo / QuickGO
Orthologs
| Databases | NCBI: entry; OMA: entry |
| Species | Human | Mouse |
| Entrez | 10771 | 66505 |
| Ensembl | ENSG00000015171 | ENSMUSG00000021156 |
| UniProt | Q15326 | Q8R5C8 |
| RefSeq (mRNA) | NM_001202464; NM_001202465; NM_001202466; NM_001202467; NM_001202468 NM_006624; NM_212479; NM_001330057 | NM_001199141; NM_144516; NM_001347470; NM_001347471; NM_001347472 NM_001347473; NM_001347474; NM_001347476; NM_001347477; NM_001347479; NM_001347480; NM_001347481 |
| RefSeq (protein) | NP_001189393; NP_001189394; NP_001189395; NP_001189396; NP_001189397 NP_001316986; NP_006615; NP_997644; NP_001357026; NP_001357027; NP_001357028; NP_001357029; NP_001357030; NP_001357031; NP_001357032; NP_001357033; NP_001357034; NP_001357035; NP_001357036; NP_001357037; NP_001357038; NP_001357039; NP_001357040; NP_001357041; NP_001357042; NP_001357043; NP_001357044; NP_001357045; NP_001357046; NP_001357047; NP_001357048; NP_001357049; NP_001357050; NP_001357051; NP_001357052; NP_001357053 | NP_001186070; NP_001334399; NP_001334400; NP_001334401; NP_001334402 NP_001334403; NP_001334405; NP_001334406; NP_001334408; NP_001334409; NP_001334410; NP_653099 |
| Location (UCSC) | Chr 10: 0.13 – 0.25 Mb | Chr 13: 9.73 – 9.82 Mb |
| PubMed search |
- Wikidata
| View/Edit Human | View/Edit Mouse |

Zinc finger MYND domain-containing protein 11 is a protein that in humans is encoded by the ZMYND11 gene.

== Function ==
The protein encoded by this gene was first identified by its ability to bind the adenovirus E1A protein. The protein localizes to the nucleus. It functions as a transcriptional repressor, and expression of E1A inhibits this repression. Alternatively spliced transcript variants encoding different isoforms have been identified.

== Interactions ==
ZMYND11 has been shown to interact with:

- BMPR1A,
- C11orf30,
- ETS2, and
- TAB1.
- H3.3K36me3
