= EMSY =

Protein-coding gene in the species Homo sapiens

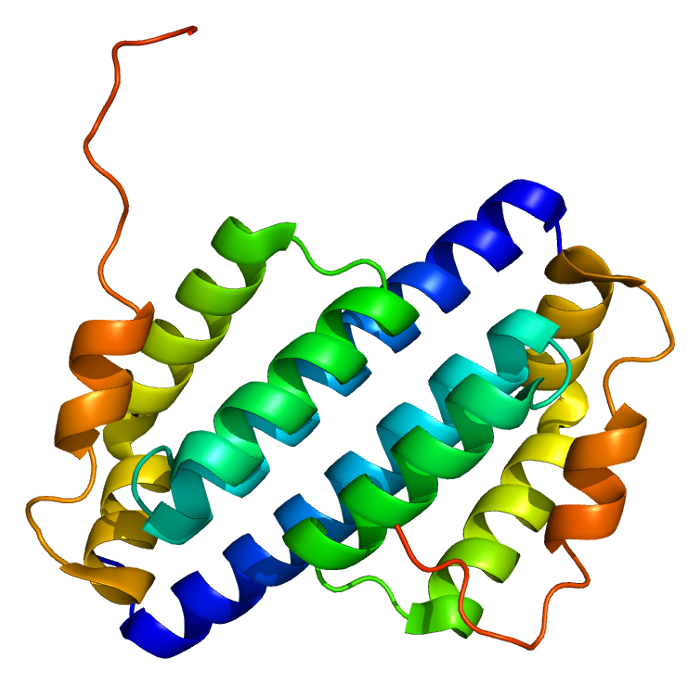

Identifiers
- Aliases: EMSY, GL002, C11orf30, BRCA2 interacting transcriptional repressor, EMSY transcriptional repressor, BRCA2 interacting
- External IDs: OMIM: 608574; MGI: 1924203; GeneCards: EMSY
Available structures
PDB	Ortholog search: PDBe RCSB
PDB	List of PDB id codes 1UTU, 1UZ3, 2FMM

Gene location (Human)
Chr.	Chromosome 11 (human)
Band	11q13.5	Start	76,444,923 bp
Band	11q13.5	End	76,553,025 bp

Gene location (Mouse)
Chr.	Chromosome 7 (mouse)
Band	7|7 E1	Start	98,236,344 bp
Band	7|7 E1	End	98,305,990 bp
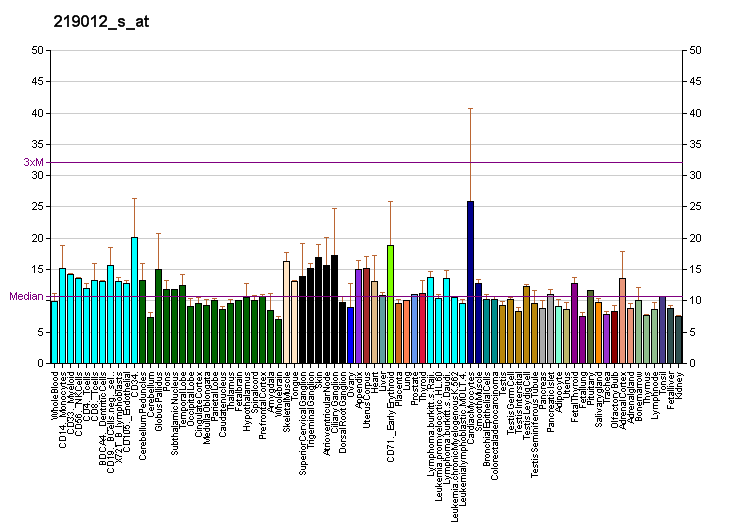
RNA expression pattern
Bgee	Human / Mouse (ortholog); Top expressed in: ventricular zone; Achilles tendon; ganglionic eminence; corpus callosum; cartilage tissue; epithelium of colon; right uterine tube; endothelial cell; right hemisphere of cerebellum; left ovary / Top expressed in: tail of embryo; genital tubercle; zygote; secondary oocyte; Rostral migratory stream; neural layer of retina; ganglionic eminence; internal carotid artery; superior frontal gyrus; vas deferens; More reference expression data
BioGPS	More reference expression data
Gene ontology
Molecular function	protein binding; protein homodimerization activity
Cellular component	nucleus; nucleoplasm
Biological process	regulation of transcription, DNA-templated; DNA repair; transcription, DNA-templated; cellular response to DNA damage stimulus; chromatin organization
Sources:Amigo / QuickGO
Orthologs
Databases	NCBI: entry; OMA: entry
Species	Human	Mouse
Entrez	56946	233545
Ensembl	ENSG00000158636	ENSMUSG00000035401
UniProt	Q7Z589	Q8BMB0
RefSeq (mRNA)	NM_001300942; NM_001300943; NM_001300944; NM_020193	NM_172280; NM_001381867; NM_001381868; NM_001381869; NM_001381870
RefSeq (protein)	NP_001287871; NP_001287872; NP_001287873; NP_064578	NP_758484; NP_001368796; NP_001368797; NP_001368798; NP_001368799
Location (UCSC)	Chr 11: 76.44 – 76.55 Mb	Chr 7: 98.24 – 98.31 Mb
PubMed search
- Wikidata
View/Edit Human	View/Edit Mouse

EMSY is a protein that in humans is encoded by the EMSY gene.

== Clinical significance ==
EMSY has been shown to associate with atopy and susceptibility to poly-sensitisation.

== Interactions ==
EMSY has been shown to interact with ZMYND11, BRCA2 and CBX1.
