= SUV39H1 =

Protein-coding gene in humans

Identifiers
- Aliases: SUV39H1, H3-K9-HMTase 1, KMT1A, MG44, SUV39H, suppressor of variegation 3-9 homolog 1, SUV39H1 histone lysine methyltransferase
- External IDs: OMIM: 300254; MGI: 1099440; GeneCards: SUV39H1
Available structures
PDB	Ortholog search: PDBe RCSB
PDB	List of PDB id codes 3MTS

Gene location (Human)
Chr.	X chromosome (human)
Band	Xp11.23	Start	48,695,554 bp
Band	Xp11.23	End	48,709,016 bp

Gene location (Mouse)
Chr.	X chromosome (mouse)
Band	X A1.1|X 3.64 cM	Start	7,927,410 bp
Band	X A1.1|X 3.64 cM	End	7,940,999 bp
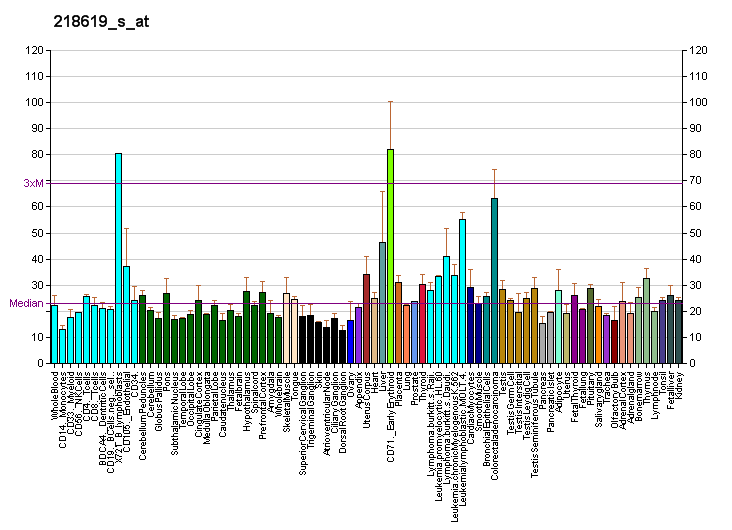
RNA expression pattern
Bgee	Human / Mouse (ortholog); Top expressed in: gonad; granulocyte; ventricular zone; apex of heart; mucosa of transverse colon; testicle; epithelium of esophagus; tibialis anterior muscle; ganglionic eminence; gastrocnemius muscle / Top expressed in: abdominal wall; fetal liver hematopoietic progenitor cell; yolk sac; ventricular zone; maxillary prominence; mandibular prominence; thymus; epiblast; tail of embryo; primitive streak; More reference expression data
BioGPS	More reference expression data
Gene ontology
Molecular function	methyltransferase activity; transferase activity; histone methyltransferase activity; histone methyltransferase activity (H3-K9 specific); S-adenosylmethionine-dependent methyltransferase activity; protein N-terminus binding; zinc ion binding; chromatin binding; transcription cis-regulatory region binding; metal ion binding; protein binding; histone-lysine N-methyltransferase activity
Cellular component	nuclear lamina; nucleoplasm; chromosome; heterochromatin; condensed nuclear chromosome; rDNA heterochromatin; chromatin silencing complex; chromosome, centromeric region; nucleus
Biological process	cell differentiation; regulation of transcription, DNA-templated; histone H3-K9 dimethylation; rhythmic process; negative regulation of circadian rhythm; negative regulation of transcription by RNA polymerase II; transcription, DNA-templated; histone H3-K9 trimethylation; cellular response to DNA damage stimulus; methylation; rDNA heterochromatin assembly; rRNA processing; histone lysine methylation; cell cycle; viral process; negative regulation of transcription, DNA-templated; cellular response to hypoxia; chromatin organization
Sources:Amigo / QuickGO
Orthologs
Databases	NCBI: entry; OMA: entry
Species	Human	Mouse
Entrez	6839	20937
Ensembl	ENSG00000101945	ENSMUSG00000039231
UniProt	O43463	O54864
RefSeq (mRNA)	NM_003173; NM_001282166	NM_001290716; NM_011514; NM_001358237
RefSeq (protein)	NP_001269095; NP_003164	NP_001277645; NP_035644; NP_001345166
Location (UCSC)	Chr X: 48.7 – 48.71 Mb	Chr X: 7.93 – 7.94 Mb
PubMed search
- Wikidata
View/Edit Human	View/Edit Mouse

Histone-lysine N-methyltransferase SUV39H1 is an enzyme that in humans is encoded by the SUV39H1 gene.

== Function ==
This gene is a member of the suppressor of variegation 3-9 homolog family and encodes a protein with a chromodomain and a C-terminal SET domain. This nuclear protein moves to the centromeres during mitosis and functions as a histone methyltransferase, methylating lysine-9 of histone H3. Overall, it plays a vital role in heterochromatin organization, chromosome segregation, and mitotic progression. In mouse embryonic stem cells, Suv39h1 expression is repressed by OCT4 protein through the induction of an antisense long non-coding RNA.

== Interactions ==
SUV39H1 has been shown to interact with:

- CBX1,
- CBX5,
- DNMT3A,
- HDAC1,
- HDAC3,
- HDAC9,
- Histone deacetylase 2,
- MBD1,
- RUNX1,
- Retinoblastoma protein, and
- SBF1.
- PIN1
