= CBX1 =

Protein-coding gene in humans

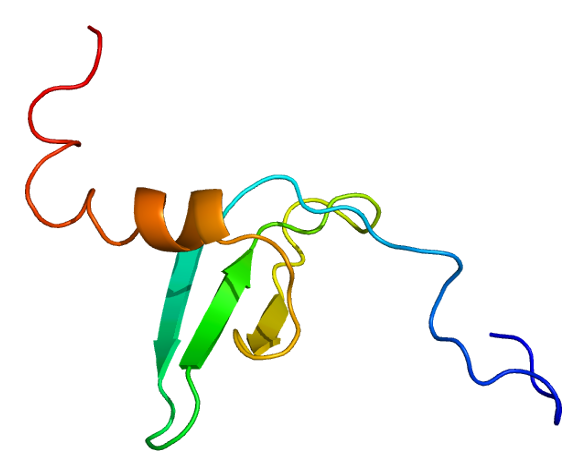

Identifiers
- Aliases: CBX1, CBX, HP1-BETA, HP1Hs-beta, HP1Hsbeta, M31, MOD1, p25beta, chromobox 1
- External IDs: OMIM: 604511; MGI: 105369; GeneCards: CBX1
Available structures
PDB	Ortholog search: PDBe RCSB
PDB	List of PDB id codes 3Q6S, 2FMM, 3F2U

Gene location (Human)
Chr.	Chromosome 17 (human)
Band	17q21.32	Start	48,070,052 bp
Band	17q21.32	End	48,101,478 bp

Gene location (Mouse)
Chr.	Chromosome 11 (mouse)
Band	11 D|11 60.11 cM	Start	96,679,953 bp
Band	11 D|11 60.11 cM	End	96,699,466 bp
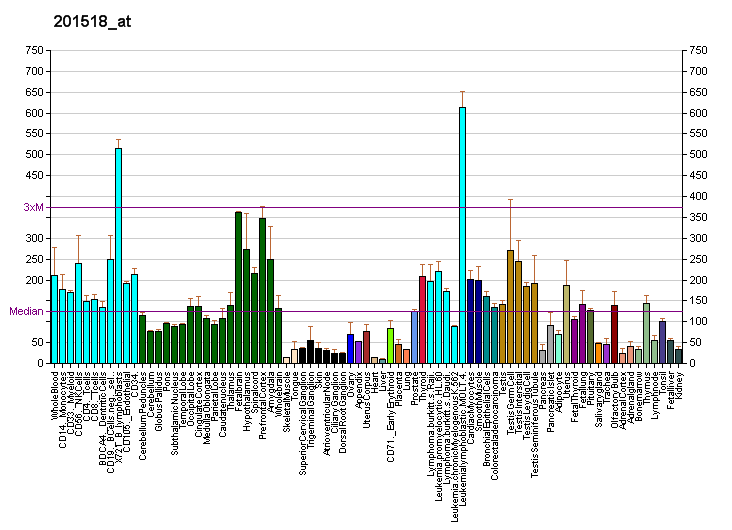
RNA expression pattern
Bgee	Human / Mouse (ortholog); Top expressed in: ganglionic eminence; ventricular zone; secondary oocyte; tendon of biceps brachii; internal globus pallidus; C1 segment; endothelial cell; optic nerve; amniotic fluid; amygdala / Top expressed in: otic placode; saccule; Gonadal ridge; genital tubercle; mandibular prominence; tail of embryo; abdominal wall; maxillary prominence; otic vesicle; vas deferens; More reference expression data
BioGPS	More reference expression data
Gene ontology
Molecular function	histone methyltransferase binding; enzyme binding; chromatin binding; protein binding; protein homodimerization activity; identical protein binding
Cellular component	chromocenter; pericentric heterochromatin; chromatin; spindle; chromosome, centromeric region; male pronucleus; female pronucleus; nucleoplasm; nucleus; site of DNA damage
Biological process	negative regulation of transcription, DNA-templated; cellular response to DNA damage stimulus
Sources:Amigo / QuickGO
Orthologs
Databases	NCBI: entry; OMA: entry
Species	Human	Mouse
Entrez	10951	12412
Ensembl	ENSG00000108468	ENSMUSG00000018666
UniProt	P83916	P83917
RefSeq (mRNA)	NM_006807; NM_001127228	NM_007622; NM_001362560; NM_001362561; NM_001362563; NM_001362564
RefSeq (protein)	NP_001120700; NP_006798	NP_031648; NP_001349489; NP_001349490; NP_001349492; NP_001349493
Location (UCSC)	Chr 17: 48.07 – 48.1 Mb	Chr 11: 96.68 – 96.7 Mb
PubMed search
- Wikidata
View/Edit Human	View/Edit Mouse

Chromobox protein homolog 1 is a protein that in humans is encoded by the CBX1 gene.

== Function ==
The protein is localized at heterochromatin sites, where it mediates gene silencing.

== Interactions ==
CBX1 has been shown to interact with:

- C11orf30,
- CBX3 and
- CBX5, and
- SUV39H1.

== See also ==
- Heterochromatin protein 1
