= Cyclin-dependent kinase 10 =

Protein-coding gene in the species Homo sapiens

CDK10

Identifiers
- Aliases: CDK10, PISSLRE, cyclin-dependent kinase 10, cyclin dependent kinase 10, ALSAS
- External IDs: OMIM: 603464; MGI: 2448549; GeneCards: CDK10
Enzyme activity
| EC # | BRENDA | ExPASy | KEGG | MetaCyc |
|---|---|---|---|---|
| 2.7.11.22 | ↗ | ↗ | ↗ | ↗ |

Gene location (Human)
| Chr. | Chromosome 16 (human) |
| Band | 16q24.3 | Start | 89,680,737 bp |
| Band | 16q24.3 | End | 89,696,354 bp |

Gene location (Mouse)
| Chr. | Chromosome 8 (mouse) |
| Band | 8|8 E1 | Start | 123,951,581 bp |
| Band | 8|8 E1 | End | 123,958,989 bp |
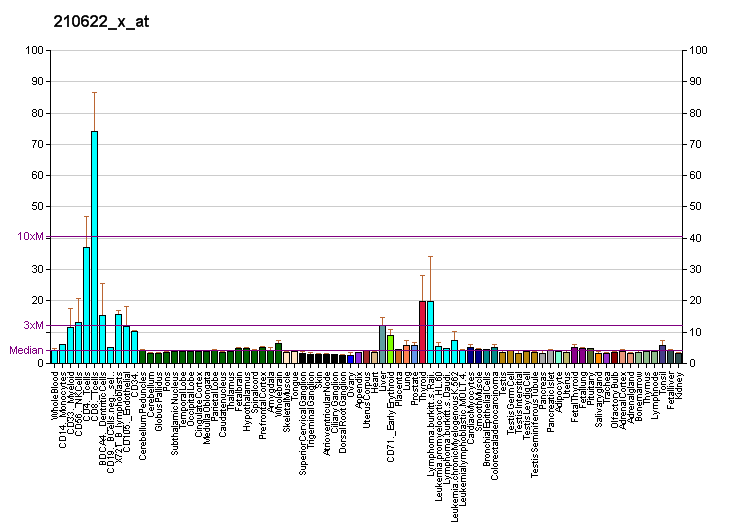

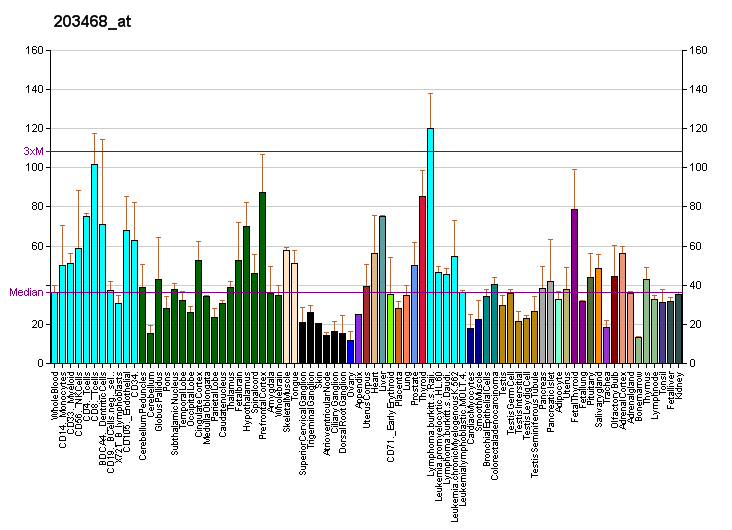

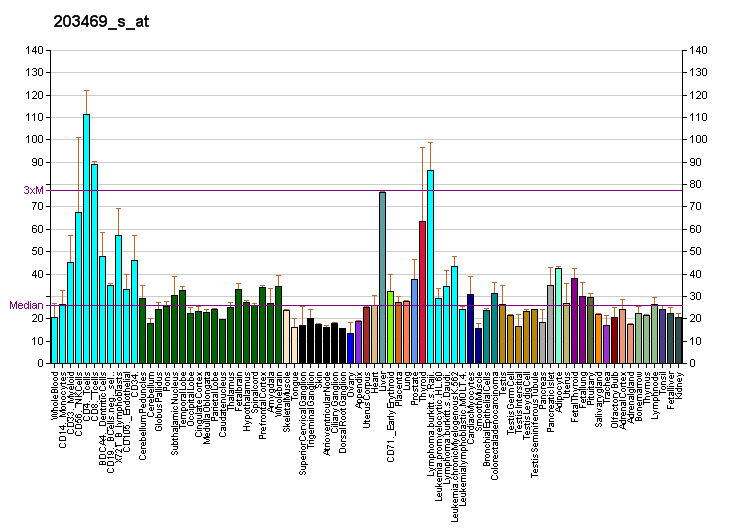
RNA expression pattern
| Bgee | Human / Mouse (ortholog); Top expressed in: right uterine tube; right lobe of thyroid gland; left lobe of thyroid gland; anterior pituitary; body of pancreas; right lobe of liver; granulocyte; mucosa of transverse colon; apex of heart; right hemisphere of cerebellum / Top expressed in: otic vesicle; superior frontal gyrus; neural layer of retina; primary visual cortex; dentate gyrus of hippocampal formation granule cell; spermatocyte; otolith organ; utricle; hand; lip; More reference expression data |
| BioGPS | More reference expression data |
Gene ontology
| Molecular function | transferase activity; nucleotide binding; protein kinase activity; cyclin-dependent protein kinase activity; protein binding; ATP binding; kinase activity; cyclin-dependent protein serine/threonine kinase activity; protein serine/threonine kinase activity |
| Cellular component | mediator complex; ciliary basal body; cytoplasm; cytoskeleton; cell projection; nucleus |
| Biological process | traversing start control point of mitotic cell cycle; phosphorylation; positive regulation of MAPK cascade; negative regulation of cell population proliferation; protein phosphorylation; peptidyl-threonine phosphorylation; regulation of actin cytoskeleton organization; negative regulation of cilium assembly; cell projection organization |
Sources:Amigo / QuickGO
Orthologs
| Databases | NCBI: entry; OMA: entry |
| Species | Human | Mouse |
| Entrez | 8558 | 234854 |
| Ensembl | ENSG00000185324 | ENSMUSG00000033862 |
| UniProt | Q15131 | Q3UMM4 |
| RefSeq (mRNA) | NM_001098533; NM_001160367; NM_003674; NM_052987; NM_052988 | NM_194444; NM_194446 |
| RefSeq (protein) | NP_001092003; NP_001153839; NP_443713; NP_443714 | NP_919426; NP_919428 |
| Location (UCSC) | Chr 16: 89.68 – 89.7 Mb | Chr 8: 123.95 – 123.96 Mb |
| PubMed search |
- Wikidata
| View/Edit Human | View/Edit Mouse |

Cell division protein kinase 10 is an enzyme that in humans is encoded by the CDK10 gene.

== Function ==
The protein encoded by this gene belongs to the CDK subfamily of the Ser/Thr protein kinase family. The CDK subfamily members are highly similar to the gene products of S. cerevisiae cdc28, and S. pombe cdc2, and are known to be essential for cell cycle progression. This kinase has been shown to play a role in cellular proliferation. Its function is limited to cell cycle G2-M phase. At least three alternatively spliced transcript variants encoding different isoforms have been reported, two of which contain multiple non-AUG translation initiation sites.

== Interactions ==
Cyclin-dependent kinase 10 has been shown to interact with ETS2.
