= ETS2 =

Protein-coding gene in humans

Identifiers
- Aliases: ETS2, ETS2IT1, ETS proto-oncogene 2, transcription factor
- External IDs: OMIM: 164740; MGI: 95456; GeneCards: ETS2
Available structures
PDB	Ortholog search: PDBe RCSB
PDB	List of PDB id codes 4BQA, 4MHV

Gene location (Human)
Chr.	Chromosome 21 (human)
Band	21q22.2	Start	38,805,183 bp
Band	21q22.2	End	38,824,955 bp

Gene location (Mouse)
Chr.	Chromosome 16 (mouse)
Band	16 C4|16 56.64 cM	Start	95,502,942 bp
Band	16 C4|16 56.64 cM	End	95,522,095 bp
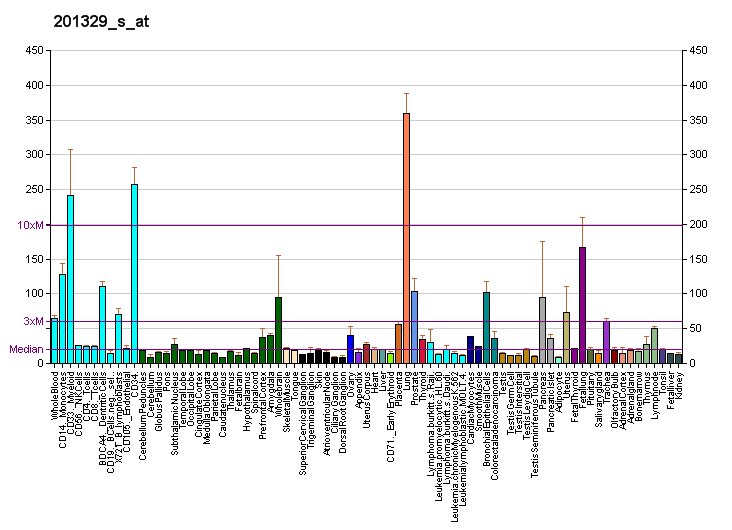

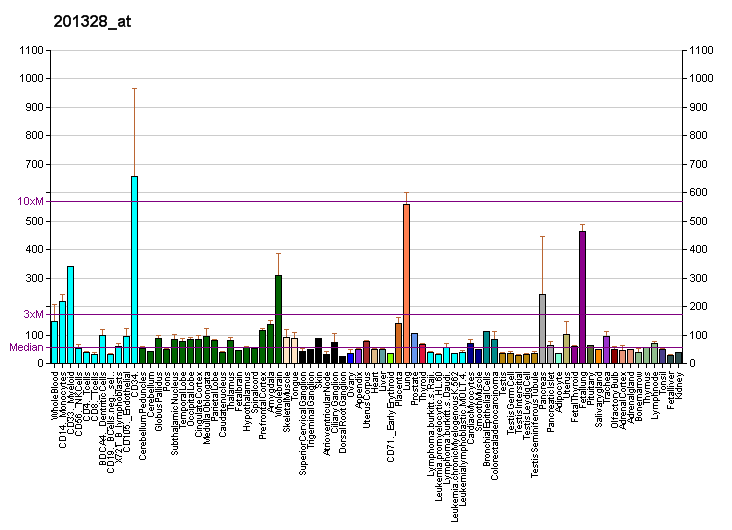
RNA expression pattern
Bgee	Human / Mouse (ortholog); Top expressed in: skin of abdomen; mucosa of urinary bladder; skin of leg; gastric mucosa; rectum; spleen; upper lobe of left lung; ectocervix; olfactory zone of nasal mucosa; right lung / Top expressed in: left lung lobe; tail of embryo; thymus; Paneth cell; granulocyte; skin of external ear; right lung; skin of back; conjunctival fornix; right lung lobe; More reference expression data
BioGPS	More reference expression data
Gene ontology
Molecular function	DNA binding; sequence-specific DNA binding; RNA polymerase II transcription regulatory region sequence-specific DNA binding; DNA-binding transcription factor activity; RNA polymerase II cis-regulatory region sequence-specific DNA binding; DNA-binding transcription repressor activity, RNA polymerase II-specific; protein binding; glucocorticoid receptor binding; protein domain specific binding; DNA-binding transcription factor activity, RNA polymerase II-specific
Cellular component	plasma membrane; nucleoplasm; nucleus; cytosol
Biological process	skeletal system development; cell differentiation; regulation of transcription, DNA-templated; negative regulation of transcription by RNA polymerase II; transcription, DNA-templated; positive regulation of transcription, DNA-templated; ectodermal cell fate commitment; mesoderm development; primitive streak formation; positive regulation of transcription by RNA polymerase II; regulation of transcription by RNA polymerase II
Sources:Amigo / QuickGO
Orthologs
Databases	NCBI: entry; OMA: entry
Species	Human	Mouse
Entrez	2114	23872
Ensembl	ENSG00000157557	ENSMUSG00000022895
UniProt	P15036	P15037
RefSeq (mRNA)	NM_001256295; NM_005239	NM_011809
RefSeq (protein)	NP_001243224; NP_005230	NP_035939
Location (UCSC)	Chr 21: 38.81 – 38.82 Mb	Chr 16: 95.5 – 95.52 Mb
PubMed search
- Wikidata
View/Edit Human	View/Edit Mouse

ETS2 is a gene that in humans is encoding the C-ETS2 protein. The protein encoded by this gene belongs to the ETS family of transcription factors. It has been found to play a key role in the development of inflammatory bowel disease.

== Interactions ==
ETS2 has been shown to interact with:

- C-jun,
- Cyclin-dependent kinase 10,
- ERG,
- myb, and
- ZMYND11.

== Clinical significance ==
ETS2 has been linked to a variety of diseases, including Takayasu's arteritis, inflammatory bowel disease, primary sclerosing cholangitis, and ankylosing spondylitis, all associated with a region on chromosome 21 at 21q22.
