= CBX5 (gene) =

Protein-coding gene in humans

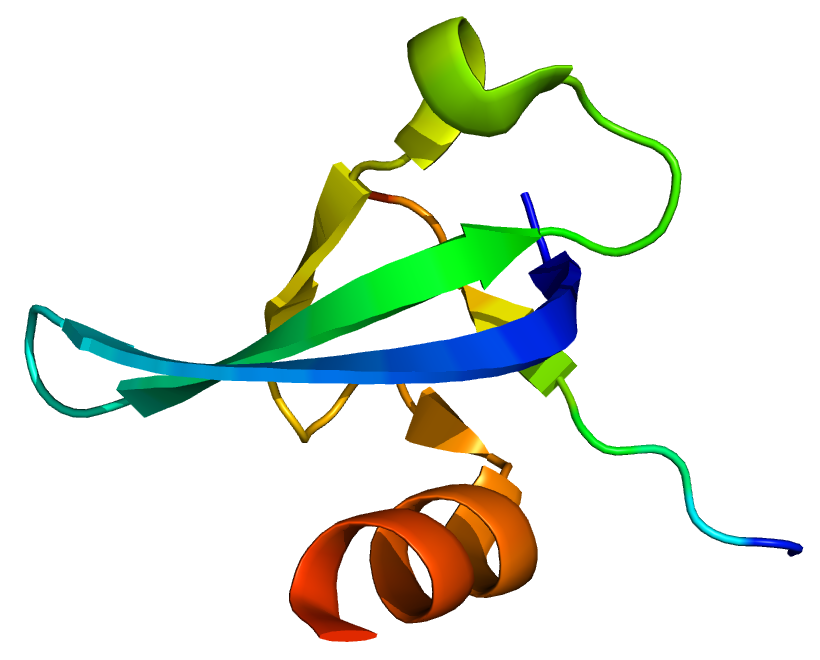

Identifiers
- Aliases: CBX5, HEL25, HP1, HP1A, chromobox 5
- External IDs: OMIM: 604478; MGI: 109372; GeneCards: CBX5
Available structures
PDB	Ortholog search: PDBe RCSB
PDB	List of PDB id codes 3FDT, 3I3C

Gene location (Human)
Chr.	Chromosome 12 (human)
Band	12q13.13	Start	54,230,942 bp
Band	12q13.13	End	54,280,133 bp

Gene location (Mouse)
Chr.	Chromosome 15 (mouse)
Band	15|15 F3	Start	103,099,971 bp
Band	15|15 F3	End	103,148,243 bp
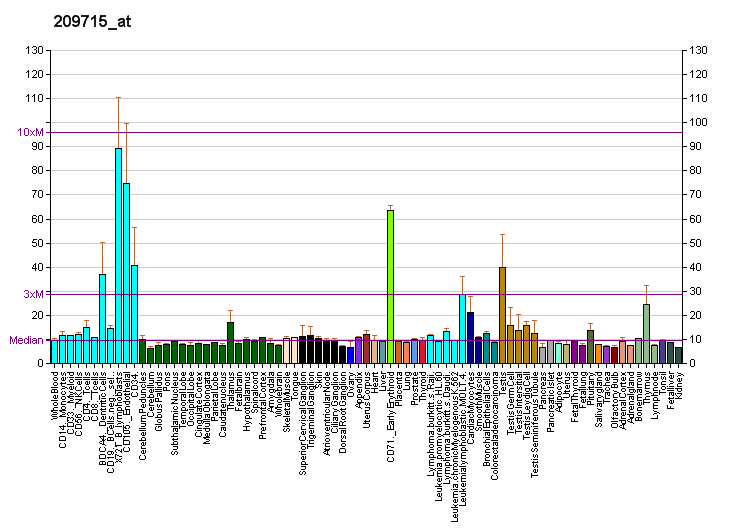
RNA expression pattern
Bgee	Human / Mouse (ortholog); Top expressed in: tendon of biceps brachii; caput epididymis; corpus epididymis; internal globus pallidus; tail of epididymis; retinal pigment epithelium; ventricular zone; mucosa of paranasal sinus; ganglionic eminence; entorhinal cortex / Top expressed in: tail of embryo; maxillary prominence; mandibular prominence; genital tubercle; somite; hand; epiblast; abdominal wall; ventricular zone; Gonadal ridge; More reference expression data
BioGPS	More reference expression data
Gene ontology
Molecular function	protein homodimerization activity; protein binding; protein-macromolecule adaptor activity; chromatin binding; histone deacetylase binding; methylated histone binding; ribonucleoprotein complex binding; protein-containing complex binding; identical protein binding
Cellular component	kinetochore; nucleus; nuclear envelope; pericentric heterochromatin; nucleolus; histone deacetylase complex; nucleoplasm; chromocenter; heterochromatin; chromosome, centromeric region; histone methyltransferase complex; transcription repressor complex; chromosome; PML body; protein-containing complex; ribonucleoprotein complex; site of DNA damage
Biological process	blood coagulation; negative regulation of transcription, DNA-templated; viral process; negative regulation of transcription by RNA polymerase II; negative regulation of G0 to G1 transition; cellular response to DNA damage stimulus
Sources:Amigo / QuickGO
Orthologs
Databases	NCBI: entry; OMA: entry
Species	Human	Mouse
Entrez	23468	12419
Ensembl	ENSG00000094916	ENSMUSG00000009575
UniProt	P45973	Q61686
RefSeq (mRNA)	NM_012117; NM_001127321; NM_001127322	NM_001076789; NM_001110216; NM_007626; NM_001358950
RefSeq (protein)	NP_001120793; NP_001120794; NP_036249	NP_001070257; NP_001103686; NP_031652; NP_001345879
Location (UCSC)	Chr 12: 54.23 – 54.28 Mb	Chr 15: 103.1 – 103.15 Mb
PubMed search
- Wikidata
View/Edit Human	View/Edit Mouse

Chromobox protein homolog 5 is a protein that in humans is encoded by the CBX5 gene. It is a highly conserved, non-histone protein part of the heterochromatin family. The protein itself is more commonly called (in humans) HP1α. Heterochromatin protein-1 (HP1) has an N-terminal domain that acts on methylated lysines residues leading to epigenetic repression. The C-terminal of this protein has a chromo shadow-domain (CSD) that is responsible for homodimerizing, as well as interacting with a variety of chromatin-associated, non-histone proteins.

== Structure ==
HP1α is 191 amino acids in length containing 6 exons. As mentioned above, this protein contains two domains, an N-terminal chromodomain (CD) and a C-terminal chromoshadow domain (CSD). The CD binds with histone 3 through a methylated lysine residue at position 9 (H3K9) while the C-terminal CSD homodimerizes and interacts with a variety of other chromatin-associated, non-histone related proteins. Connecting these two domains is the hinge region.

=== Chromodomain ===
Once translated, the chromodomain will take on a globular conformation consisting of three β-sheets and one α-helix. The β-sheets are packed up against the helix at the carboxy terminal segment. The charges on the β sheets are negative thus making it difficult for it to bind to the DNA as a DNA-binding motif. Instead, HP1α binds to the histones as a protein interaction motif. Specific binding to CD to the methylated H3K9 is mediated by three hydrophobic side chains called the "hydrophobic box". Other sites on HP1 will interact with the H3 tails from neighbouring histones which will give structure to the flexible N-terminal tail of the histones. Neighbouring H3 histones can affect HP1 binding by post-translationally modifying the tails.

=== Chromoshadow domain ===
The CSD much resembles that of the CD. It too has a globular conformation containing three β-sheets, however it possesses two α-helices as opposed to just the one in the CD. The CSD readily homodimerizes in vitro and as a result forms a groove which can accommodate HP1 associated proteins that have a specific consensus sequence: PxVxL, where P is Proline, V is Valine, L is Leucine and x is any amino acid.

== Mechanism of action ==
HP1α primarily functions as a gene silencer, which is dependent on the interactions between the CD and the methyl H3K9 mark. The hydrophobic box on the CD provides the appropriate environment for the methylated lysine residue. While the exact mechanism of how gene silencing is done is unknown, experimental data concluded the rapid exchange of biological macromolecules in and out of the heterochromatin region. This suggests HP1 isn't acting as a glue holding the heterochromatin together, but rather there are competing molecules within that interact in various ways to create a closed complex leading to gene repression or an open, euchromatin structure with gene activation. HP1 concentration is higher and more static in areas of the chromosome where methylated H3K9 residues reside, giving the chromosome its closed, gene-repressed heterochromatin structure. It has also been shown that the more methylated the H3 lysine is, the higher the affinity HP1 has for it. That is, trimethylated lysine residues bind tighter to HP1 than dimethylated residues, which bind better than monomethylated residues.

The localisation driving factor is currently unknown.

== Evolutionary conservation ==
HP1α is a highly evolutionarily conserved protein, existing in species such as Schizosaccharomyces pombe, a type of yeast, all the way to humans. The N-terminal chromodomain and C-terminal chromoshadow domain appear to be much more conserved (approximately 50-70% amino acid similarity) than the hinge region (approximately 25-30% similarity with the Drosophila HP1 homolog).

== Interactions ==
CBX5 (gene) has been shown to interact with:

- CBX1,
- CBX3,
- CHAF1A,
- DNMT3B,
- HDAC4,
- HDAC9,
- Histone deacetylase 5,
- Ku70,
- Lamin B receptor,
- MBD1,
- MIS12,
- SMARCA4,
- SUV39H1,
- TAF4, and
- TRIM28.
- STAT5A,

== See also ==
- Heterochromatin protein 1
