= Chromodomain =

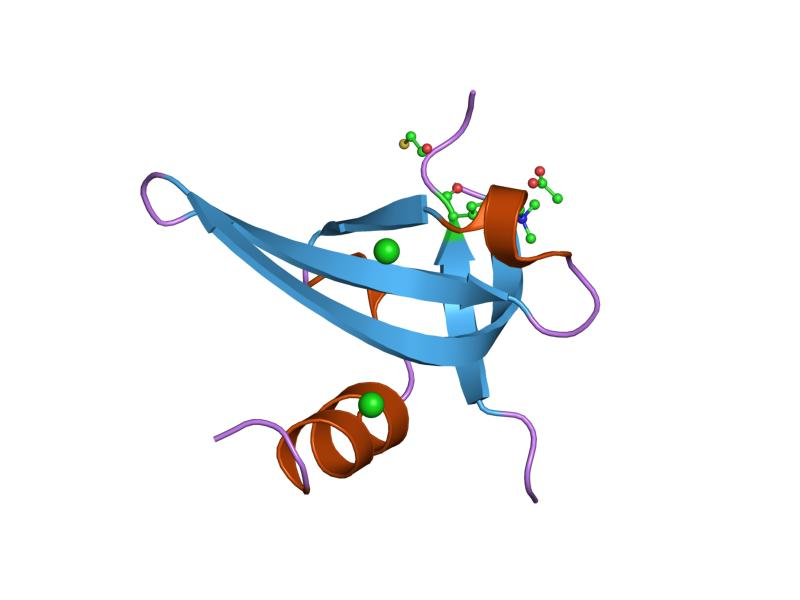
- Structure of polycomb chromodomain.

Identifiers
- Symbol: Chromodomain
- Pfam: PF00385
- InterPro: IPR000953
- SMART: SM00298
- PROSITE: PS50013
- SCOP2: 1pfb / SCOPe / SUPFAM
- CDD: cd00024
Available protein structures:
- PDB: IPR000953 PF00385 (ECOD; PDBsum)
- AlphaFold: IPR000953; PF00385

Chromodomains are evolutionarily conserved protein domains found across a wide variety of eukaryotic species. Some chromodomain-containing genes have multiple alternative splicing isoforms that omit the chromodomain entirely. They are prominent in chromatin-associated proteins, such as the Polycomb-group (PcG) proteins and Heterochromatin Protein 1 (HP1), where they function as methylated lysine readers involved in gene regulation and chromatin remodeling, facilitating both gene silencing and activation by modifying chromatin structure. Chromodomain-containing proteins also bind methylated histones and appear in the RNA-induced transcriptional silencing complex.

== Structural Conservation and Specificity ==
=== Conserved Fold ===
Chromodomains exhibit a high degree of structural conservation across a wide range of chromatin-associated proteins, including Polycomb (e.g., Cbx2, Cbx4, Cbx6, Cbx7, Cbx8) and HP1 family members, as predicted by sequence homology. Chromodomains share a conserved architecture comprising a three-stranded, curved anti-parallel β-sheet adjacent to a C-terminal α-helix. This arrangement forms a hydrophobic groove that accommodates methylated lysine residues from histone tails, facilitating specific molecular interactions. The methylated region of the peptide adopts a β-strand conformation when interacting with the chromodomain's groove, resulting in a β sandwich arrangement. Despite the overall conservation, subtle sequence variations exist within chromodomains, particularly in the residues lining the hydrophobic cleft, which influences binding specificity for methylated lysine residues and contributes to the diverse biological functions of chromodomain-containing proteins.

=== Aromatic Cage ===
A defining feature of chromodomains is the 'aromatic cage,' a structural motif made up of three aromatic residues (sometimes along with acidic amino acids) that enables selective binding to methylated lysine groups. This arrangement allows for cation-π interactions, where the ammonium group of the methylated lysine interacts with specific aromatic residues, such as tryptophan. The structural conservation of the aromatic cage across chromodomains demonstrates their selectivity and affinity for methylated histone tails (e.g., H3K9me3 in HP1α, H3K27me3 in Polycomb), enabling their central role as methylated lysine readers in gene regulation and chromatin remodeling.

== Molecular Recognition and Binding Partners ==
While chromodomains are best known for recognizing methylated lysine residues on histone tails, their binding repertoire extends beyond histones. They can interact with RNA, DNA, and various non-histone proteins, thereby expanding their regulatory roles within the cell.

== Classification ==
Chromodomain proteins are classified into several families based on additional domains present. Notable families include:

- HP1/Chromobox (Cbx): Recognize H3K9me and promote constitutive heterochromatin formation
- Polycomb (Pc): Bind H3K27me and maintain facultative heterochromatin
- CHD (Chromodomain-Helicase DNA-binding): Characterized by two tandem chromodomains; involved in transcriptionally active regions by binding H3K4me
- Chromo barrel domain family and others (totaling 13 known families).

The CHD subfamily is further divided into three groups (CHD1/2, CHD3/4/5, CHD6/7/8/9). CHD1 and CHD2 are notable for their extended linker sequences between the first two β-strands of the first chromodomain and are more extensively characterized.

== Functional Diversity ==
=== Localization ===
Most chromodomain proteins are found in the nucleus, particularly in chromatin-dense areas like heterochromatin, which is linked to gene silencing. However, they can also be present in euchromatin, where genes are actively transcribed. Chromodomains are rarely found outside the nucleus, with exceptions such as the chloroplast signal recognition particle protein cpSRP43 in Arabidopsis.

=== Biological Roles ===
Chromodomains play diverse biological roles, extending beyond gene repression. For example, CHD1 is implicated in transcriptionally active chromatin, demonstrating that chromodomains participate in both gene silencing and activation. While their structural conservation across species and protein families illustrates their fundamental role in chromatin biology, sequence variations enable a range of specific interactions and biological outcomes. Chromodomains play central roles in epigenetic regulation by interpreting histone modifications and establishing patterns of gene expression essential for development and cell differentiation. They participate in diverse biological processes, including embryonic development, cellular differentiation, and lifespan regulation, as demonstrated in model organisms.

=== Functional Breadth ===
While many chromodomains function as methyl-lysine readers, others have specialized roles, such as targeting retrotransposons or mediating nucleic acid interactions. The functional diversity of chromodomains suggests their potential utility in comprehensive methylome analysis and synthetic biology applications.

== Biological and Biomedical Implications ==
Insights from model organisms have called attention to the importance of chromodomains in maintaining epigenetic integrity, with direct implications for human health. Dysregulation of chromodomain-mediated processes is linked to diseases such as cancer and developmental disorders. Efforts to engineer chromodomains with enhanced binding affinity-such as the Asp9/Glu33 double-substitution in the CBX chromodomain family have focused primarily on HP1 family members. For instance, engineered CBX1 chromodomains exhibit increased affinity for the H3K9me3 mark, and structural studies, including those utilizing the Protein Data Bank and homology modeling, have facilitated the rational design of such variants. These strategies may be extended to other PcG proteins, broadening the potential for therapeutic and research applications.

== See also ==
- Bromodomain
- Chromo shadow domain
