= CBX3 =

Protein-coding gene in humans

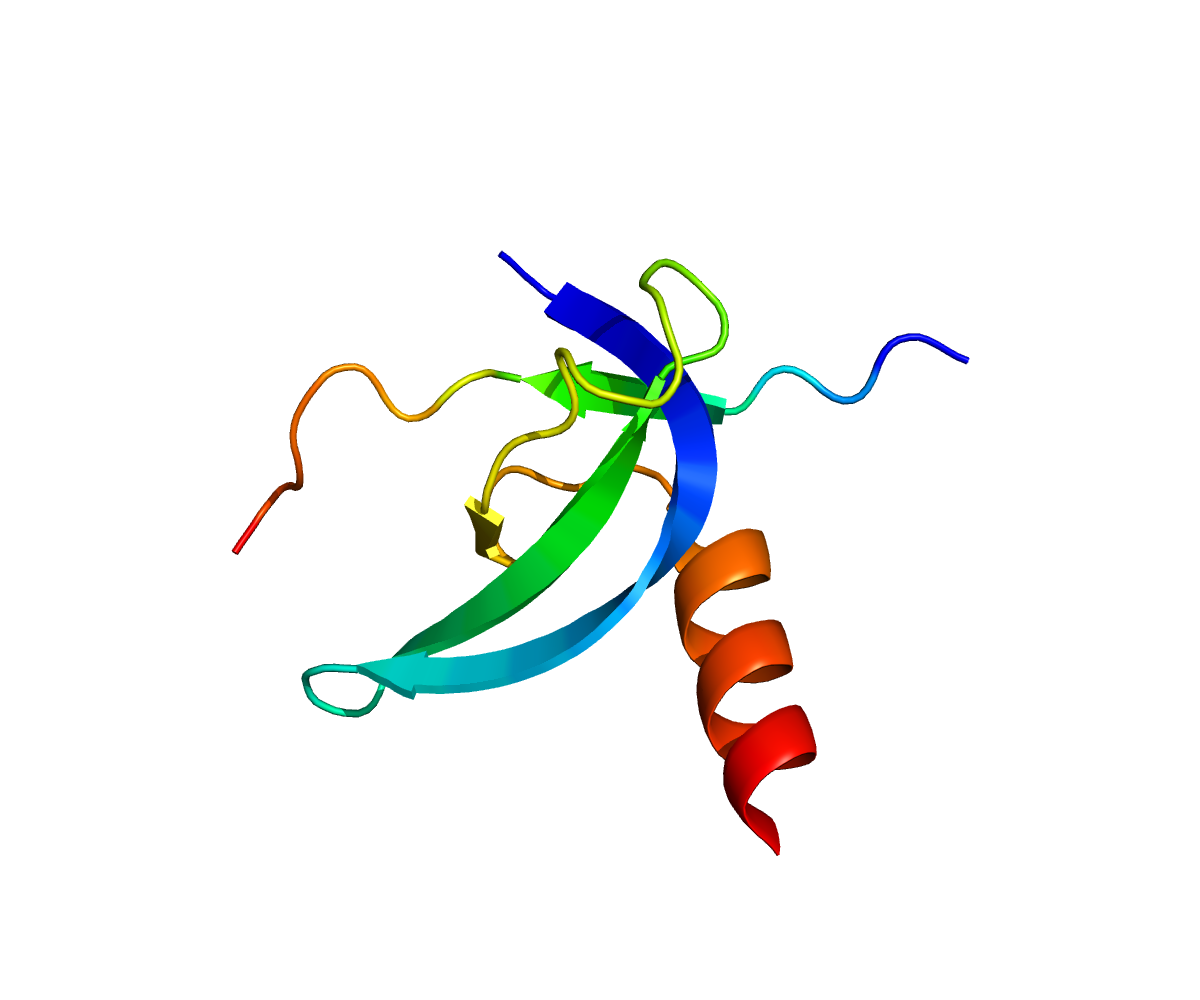

Identifiers
- Aliases: CBX3, HECH, HP1-GAMMA, HP1Hs-gamma, chromobox 3
- External IDs: OMIM: 604477; MGI: 108515; GeneCards: CBX3
Available structures
PDB	Ortholog search: PDBe RCSB
PDB	List of PDB id codes 3TZD, 2L11, 3DM1, 3KUP

Gene location (Human)
Chr.	Chromosome 7 (human)
Band	7p15.2	Start	26,201,162 bp
Band	7p15.2	End	26,213,607 bp

Gene location (Mouse)
Chr.	Chromosome 6 (mouse)
Band	6 B3|6 24.89 cM	Start	51,447,340 bp
Band	6 B3|6 24.89 cM	End	51,460,684 bp
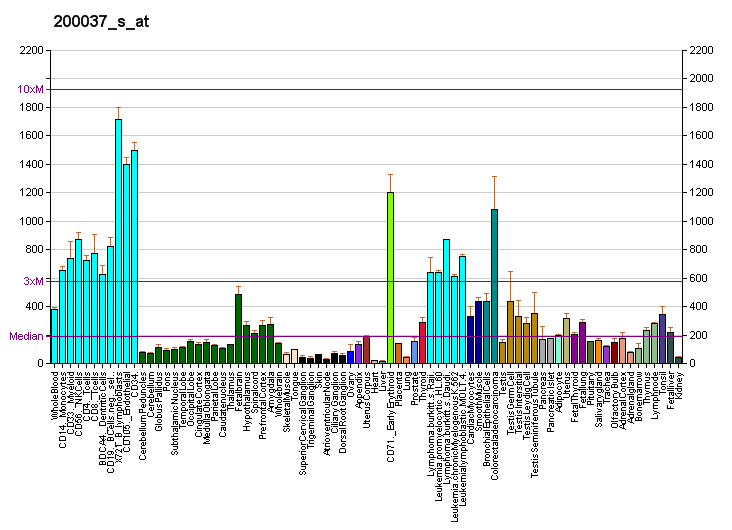
RNA expression pattern
Bgee	Human / Mouse (ortholog); Top expressed in: endothelial cell; ganglionic eminence; visceral pleura; ventricular zone; parietal pleura; germinal epithelium; tibia; epithelium of nasopharynx; trabecular bone; endometrium / Top expressed in: ventricular zone; genital tubercle; embryo; embryo; tail of embryo; morula; dentate gyrus of hippocampal formation granule cell; blastocyst; yolk sac; neural layer of retina; More reference expression data
BioGPS	More reference expression data
Gene ontology
Molecular function	protein domain specific binding; histone methyltransferase binding; protein binding; identical protein binding; enzyme binding
Cellular component	nuclear envelope; spindle; nuclear inner membrane; chromatin; chromosome, centromeric region; nucleus; condensed chromosome, centromeric region; nucleoplasm; site of DNA damage; senescence-associated heterochromatin focus
Biological process	chromatin remodeling; regulation of transcription, DNA-templated; rhythmic process; transcription, DNA-templated; negative regulation of transcription, DNA-templated; negative regulation of G0 to G1 transition; chromatin organization; cellular response to DNA damage stimulus; cellular response to dexamethasone stimulus
Sources:Amigo / QuickGO
Orthologs
Databases	NCBI: entry; OMA: entry
Species	Human	Mouse
Entrez	11335	12417
Ensembl	ENSG00000122565	ENSMUSG00000029836
UniProt	Q13185	P23198
RefSeq (mRNA)	NM_007276; NM_016587	NM_001037798; NM_007624; NM_001355002
RefSeq (protein)	NP_009207; NP_057671	n/a
Location (UCSC)	Chr 7: 26.2 – 26.21 Mb	Chr 6: 51.45 – 51.46 Mb
PubMed search
- Wikidata
View/Edit Human	View/Edit Mouse

Chromobox protein homolog 3 is a protein that is encoded by the CBX3 gene in humans.

At the nuclear envelope, the nuclear lamina and heterochromatin are adjacent to the inner nuclear membrane. The protein encoded by this gene binds DNA and is a component of heterochromatin. This protein also can bind lamin B receptor, an integral membrane protein found in the inner nuclear membrane. The dual binding functions of the encoded protein may explain the association of heterochromatin with the inner nuclear membrane. Two transcript variants encoding the same protein but differing in the 5' UTR, have been found for this gene.

== Interactions ==
CBX3 has been shown to interact with PIM1, Ki-67, Lamin B receptor, CBX5 and CBX1.

== See also ==
- Heterochromatin protein 1
