= Heterochromatin protein 1 =

Protein family

chromobox homolog 5

Identifiers
- Symbol: CBX5
- Alt. symbols: HP1-alpha
- NCBI gene: 23468
- HGNC: 1555
- OMIM: 604478
- RefSeq: NM_012117
- UniProt: P45973

Other data
- Locus: Chr. 12 q13.13
Search for
- Structures: Swiss-model
- Domains: InterPro

chromobox homolog 1

Identifiers
- Symbol: CBX1
- Alt. symbols: HP1-beta
- NCBI gene: 10951
- HGNC: 1551
- OMIM: 604511
- RefSeq: NM_006807
- UniProt: P83916

Other data
- Locus: Chr. 17 q21.32
Search for
- Structures: Swiss-model
- Domains: InterPro

chromobox homolog 3

Identifiers
- Symbol: CBX3
- Alt. symbols: HP1-gamma
- NCBI gene: 11335
- HGNC: 1553
- OMIM: 604477
- RefSeq: NM_007276
- UniProt: Q13185

Other data
- Locus: Chr. 7 p21-15
Search for
- Structures: Swiss-model
- Domains: InterPro

The family of heterochromatin protein 1 (HP1) ("Chromobox Homolog", CBX) consists of highly conserved proteins, which have important functions in the cell nucleus. These functions include gene repression by heterochromatin formation, transcriptional activation, regulation of binding of cohesion complexes to centromeres, sequestration of genes to the nuclear periphery, transcriptional arrest, maintenance of heterochromatin integrity, gene repression at the single nucleosome level, gene repression by heterochromatization of euchromatin, and DNA repair. HP1 proteins are fundamental units of heterochromatin packaging that are enriched at the centromeres and telomeres of nearly all eukaryotic chromosomes with the notable exception of budding yeast, in which a yeast-specific silencing complex of SIR (silent information regulatory) proteins serve a similar function. Members of the HP1 family are characterized by an N-terminal chromodomain and a C-terminal chromoshadow domain, separated by a hinge region. HP1 is also found at some euchromatic sites, where its binding can correlate with either gene repression or gene activation. HP1 was originally discovered by Tharappel C James and Sarah Elgin in 1986 as a factor in the phenomenon known as position effect variegation in Drosophila melanogaster.

== Paralogs and orthologs ==
Three different paralogs of HP1 are found in Drosophila melanogaster, HP1a, HP1b and HP1c. Subsequently orthologs of HP1 were also discovered in S. pombe (Swi6), Xenopus (Xhp1α and Xhp1γ), Chicken (CHCB1, CHCB2 and CHCB3), Tetrahymena (Pdd1p) and many other metazoans. In mammals, there are three paralogs: HP1α, HP1β and HP1γ. In Arabidopsis thaliana (a plant), there is one structural homolog: Like Heterochromatin Protein 1 (LHP1), also known as Terminal Flower 2 (TFL2).

=== HP1β in mammals ===
HP1β interacts with the histone methyltransferase (HMTase) Suv(3-9)h1 and is a component of both pericentric and telomeric heterochromatin. HP1β is a dosage-dependent modifier of pericentric heterochromatin-induced silencing and silencing is thought to involve a dynamic association of the HP1β chromodomain with the tri-methylated histone H3 K9me3. The binding of the K9me3-modified H3 N-terminal tail by the chromodomain is a defining feature of HP1 proteins.

== Interacting proteins ==
HP1 interacts with numerous other proteins/molecules (in addition to H3K9me3) with different cellular functions in different organisms. Some of these HP1 interacting partners are: histone H1, histone H3, histone H4, histone methyltransferase, DNA methyltransferase, methyl CpG binding protein MeCP2, and the origin recognition complex protein ORC2.

== Binding affinity and cooperativity ==
HP1 has a versatile structure with three main components; a chromodomain, a chromoshadow domain, and a hinge domain. The chromodomain is responsible for the specific binding affinity of HP1 to histone H3 when tri-methylated at the 9th lysine residue. HP1 binding affinity to nucleosomes containing histone H3 methylated at lysine K9 is significantly higher than to those with unmethylated lysine K9. HP1 binds nucleosomes as a dimer and in principle can form multimeric complexes. Some studies have interpreted HP1 binding in terms of nearest-neighbor cooperative binding. However, the analysis of available data on HP1 binding to nucleosomal arrays in vitro shows that experimental HP1 binding isotherms can be explained by a simple model without cooperative interactions between neighboring HP1 dimers. Nevertheless, favorable interactions between nearest neighbors of HP1 lead to limited spreading of HP1 and its marks along the nucleosome chain in vivo.

The binding affinity of the HP1 chromodomain has also been implicated in regulation of alternative splicing. HP1 can act as both an enhancer and silencer of splicing alternative exons. The exact role it plays in regulation varies by gene and is dependent on the methylation patterns within the gene body. In humans, the role of HP1 on splicing has been characterized for alternative splicing of the EDA exon from the fibronectin gene. In this pathway HP1 acts as a mediator protein for repression of alternative splicing of the EDA exon. When the chromatin within the gene body is not methylated, HP1 does not bind and the EDA exon is transcribed. When the chromatin is methylated, HP1 binds the chromatin and recruits the splicing factor SRSF3 which binds HP1 and splices the EDA exon from the mature transcript. In this mechanism HP1 recognizes the H3K9me3 methylated chromatin and recruits a splicing factor to alternatively splice the mRNA, thereby excluding the EDA exon from the mature transcript.

== Role in DNA repair ==
All HP1 isoforms (HP1-alpha, HP1-beta, and HP1-gamma) are recruited to DNA at sites of UV-induced damages, at oxidative damages and at DNA breaks. The HP1 protein isoforms are required for DNA repair of these damages. The presence of the HP1 protein isoforms at DNA damages assists with the recruitment of other proteins involved in subsequent DNA repair pathways. The recruitment of the HP1 isoforms to DNA damage is rapid, with half maximum recruitment (t_{1/2}) by 180 seconds in response to UV damage, and a t_{1/2} of 85 seconds in response to double-strand breaks. This is a bit slower than the recruitment of the very earliest proteins recruited to sites of DNA damage, though HP1 recruitment is still one of the very early steps in DNA repair. Other earlier proteins may be recruited with a t_{1/2} of 40 seconds for UV damage and a t_{1/2} of about 1 second in response to double-strand breaks (see DNA damage response).

== See also ==
- Epigenetics
- nucleosome
- Heterochromatin
