= Proliferation marker protein Ki-67 =

Mammalian protein found in humans

MKI67
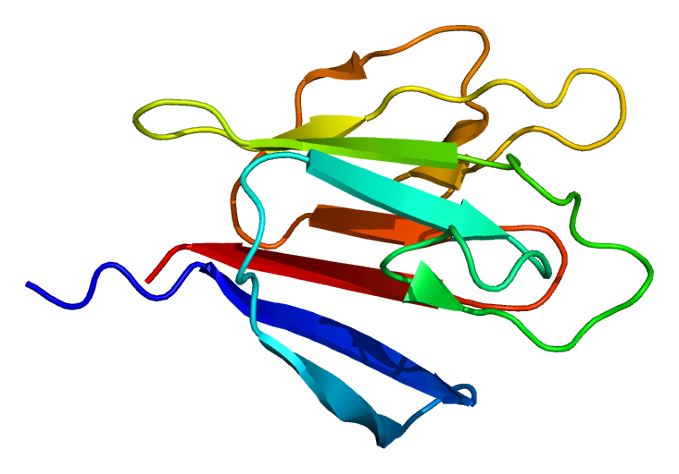

Identifiers
- Aliases: MKI67, marker of proliferation Ki-67, KIA, MIB-, MIB-1, PPP1R105
- External IDs: OMIM: 176741; MGI: 106035; GeneCards: MKI67
Available structures
PDB	Ortholog search: PDBe RCSB
PDB	List of PDB id codes 1R21, 2AFF

Gene location (Human)
Chr.	Chromosome 10 (human)
Band	10q26.2	Start	128,096,659 bp
Band	10q26.2	End	128,126,423 bp

Gene location (Mouse)
Chr.	Chromosome 7 (mouse)
Band	7|7 F3	Start	135,291,513 bp
Band	7|7 F3	End	135,318,090 bp
RNA expression pattern
Bgee	Human / Mouse (ortholog); Top expressed in: ventricular zone; ganglionic eminence; bone marrow cell; gonad; trabecular bone; tendon of biceps brachii; thymus; stromal cell of endometrium; mucosa of transverse colon; testicle / Top expressed in: fetal liver hematopoietic progenitor cell; tibiofemoral joint; human fetus; Paneth cell; genital tubercle; vas deferens; hair follicle; primitive streak; tail of embryo; efferent ductule; More reference expression data
BioGPS	n/a
Gene ontology
Molecular function	nucleotide binding; protein C-terminus binding; protein binding; ATP binding; DNA binding; RNA binding
Cellular component	cytoplasm; membrane; chromosome; nucleolus; chromosome, centromeric region; nucleus; condensed chromosome; nuclear body
Biological process	cellular response to heat; response to organic cyclic compound; DNA metabolic process; animal organ regeneration; hyaluronan metabolic process; cell cycle; regulation of chromosome segregation; cell population proliferation; regulation of mitotic nuclear division; regulation of chromatin organization; meiosis
Sources:Amigo / QuickGO
Orthologs
Databases	NCBI: entry; OMA: entry
Species	Human	Mouse
Entrez	4288	17345
Ensembl	ENSG00000148773	ENSMUSG00000031004
UniProt	P46013	E9PVX6
RefSeq (mRNA)	NM_001145966; NM_002417	NM_001081117
RefSeq (protein)	NP_001139438; NP_002408	NP_001074586
Location (UCSC)	Chr 10: 128.1 – 128.13 Mb	Chr 7: 135.29 – 135.32 Mb
PubMed search
- Wikidata
View/Edit Human	View/Edit Mouse

Proliferation marker protein Ki-67, also known as Antigen Kiel 67 or MKI67, is a protein that in humans is encoded by the MKI67 gene (marker of proliferation Ki-67).

== Function ==
Antigen KI-67 is a nuclear protein that is associated with cellular proliferation and ribosomal RNA transcription. Inactivation of antigen KI-67 leads to inhibition of ribosomal RNA synthesis, but does not significantly affect cell proliferation in vivo: Ki-67 mutant mice developed normally and cells lacking Ki-67 proliferated efficiently.

== Use as a marker of proliferating cells ==
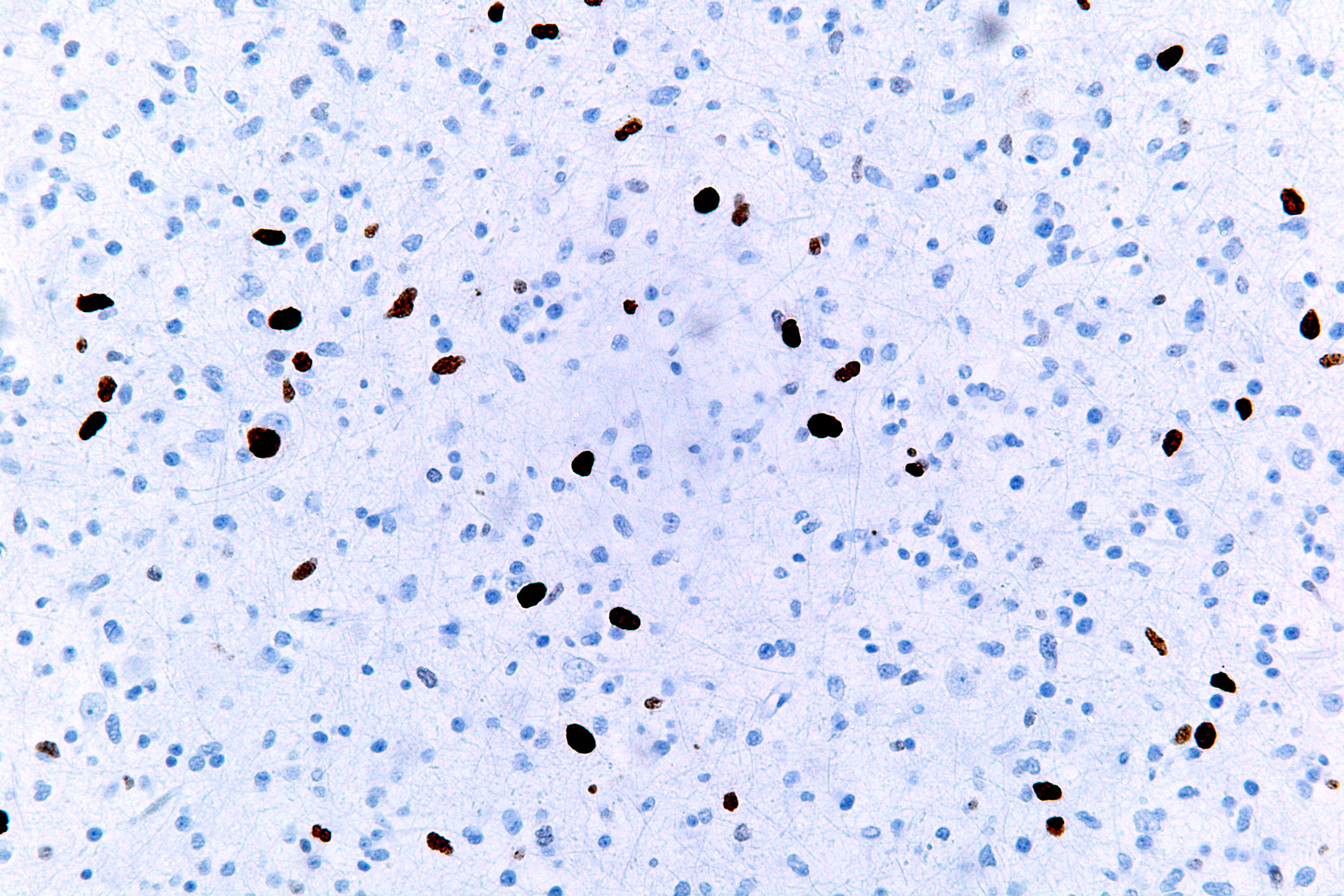
Ki-67 immunostaining of a brain tumour with a high proliferative rate

The Ki-67 protein (also known as MKI67) is a cellular marker for proliferation, and can be used in immunohistochemistry. It is strictly associated with cell proliferation. During interphase, the Ki-67 antigen can be exclusively detected within the cell nucleus, whereas in mitosis most of the protein is relocated to the surface of the chromosomes. Ki-67 protein is present during all active phases of the cell cycle (G_{1}, S, G_{2}, and mitosis), but is absent in resting (quiescent) cells (G_{0}). Cellular content of Ki-67 protein markedly increases during cell progression through S phase of the cell cycle. In breast cancer Ki67 identifies a high proliferative subset of patients with ER-positive breast cancer who derive greater benefit from adjuvant chemotherapy.

== Antibody labeling ==
Ki-67 is an excellent marker to determine the growth fraction of a given cell population. The fraction of Ki-67-positive tumor cells (the Ki-67 labeling index) is often correlated with the clinical course of cancer. The best-studied examples in this context are prostate, brain and breast carcinomas, as well as nephroblastoma and neuroendocrine tumors. For these types of tumors, the prognostic value for survival and tumor recurrence have repeatedly been proven in uni- and multivariate analysis.

=== MIB-1 ===
Ki-67 and MIB-1 monoclonal antibodies are directed against different epitopes of the same proliferation-related antigen. Ki-67 and MIB-1 may be used on fixed sections. MIB-1 is used in clinical applications to determine the Ki-67 labelling index. One of its primary advantages over the original Ki-67 antibody (and the reason why it has essentially supplanted the original antibody for clinical use) is that it can be used on formalin-fixed paraffin-embedded sections, after heat-mediated antigen retrieval (see next section below).

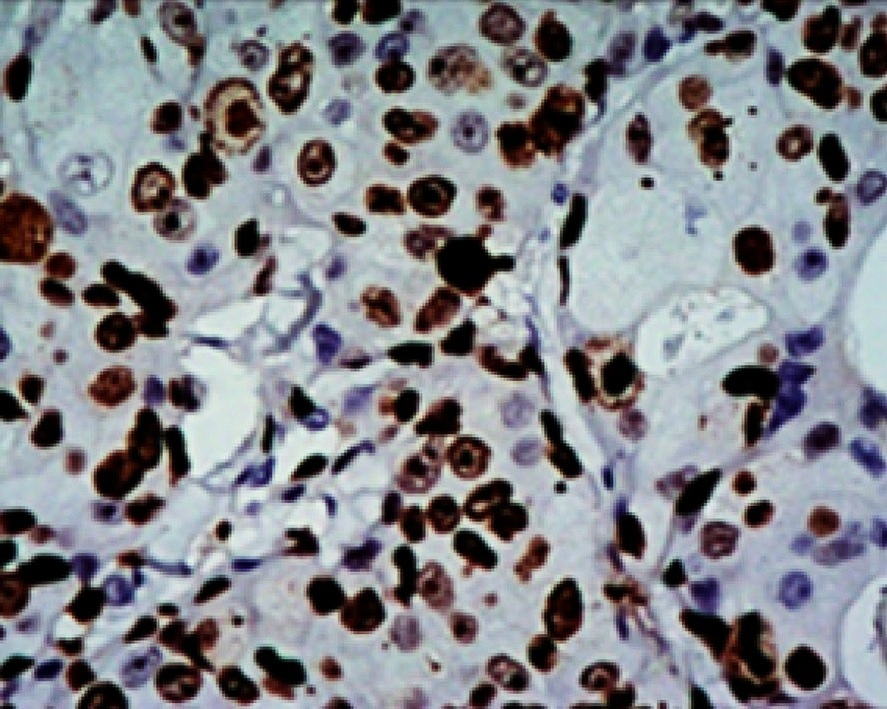
High Ki-67 expression in an invasive breast cancer, with cancer nuclei being stained (brown). There is tumor cell positivity in 70% of the cells:
Ki-67 labelling index = 70%

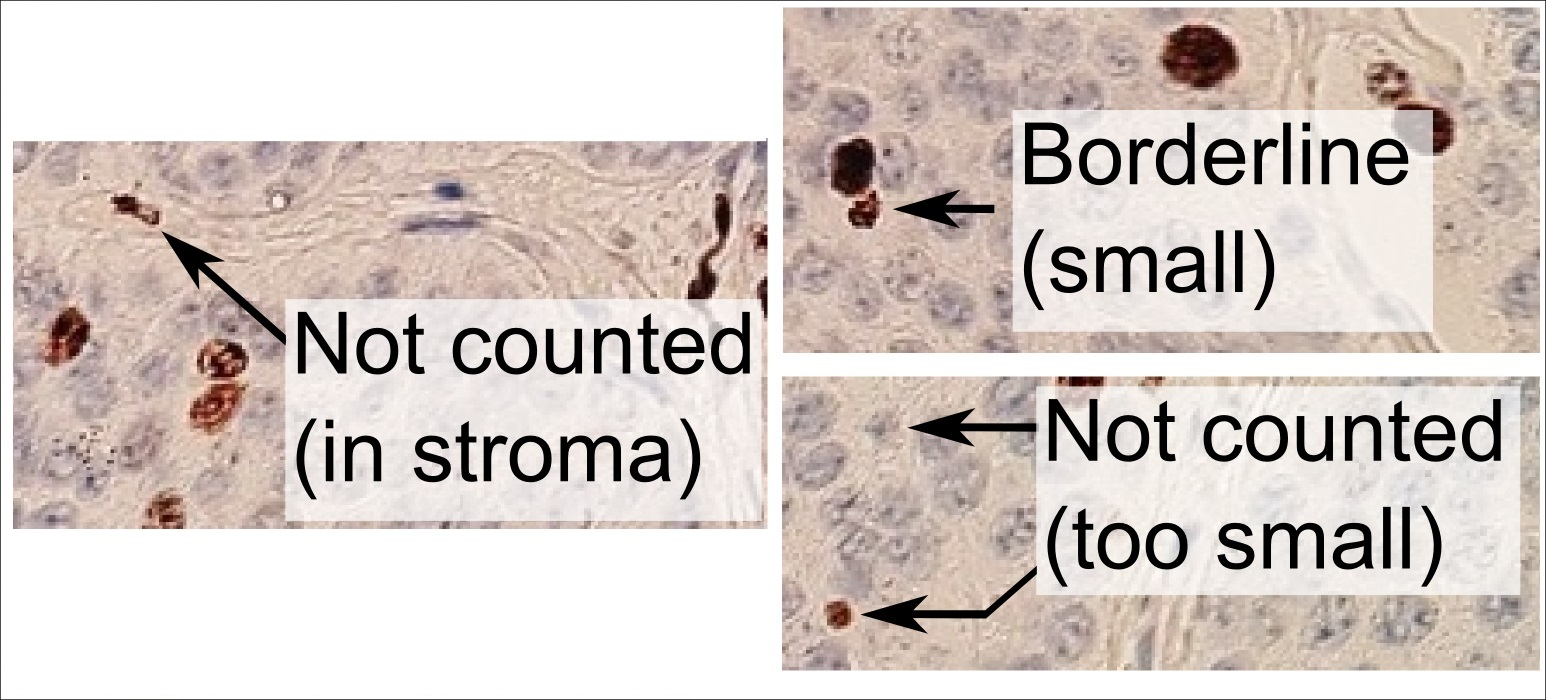
Counting positive versus negative nuclei with Ki-67 labeling, in this case in a neuroendocrine tumor of the small intestine. To count as positive, a nucleus should be at least half within the field of view, be large enough, and not be located in the stroma. Otherwise, even weakly positive nuclei count as positive.

=== Original Ki-67 antibody ===
The Ki-67 protein was originally defined by the prototype monoclonal antibody Ki-67, which was generated by immunizing mice with nuclei of the Hodgkin lymphoma cell line L428. The name is derived from the city of origin (Kiel, Germany) and the number of the original clone in the 96-well plate.

== Interactions ==
Ki-67 (protein) has been shown to interact with CBX3.

== See also ==
- PCNA - Proliferating Cell Nuclear Antigen, expressed during the DNA synthesis.

== Additional images ==
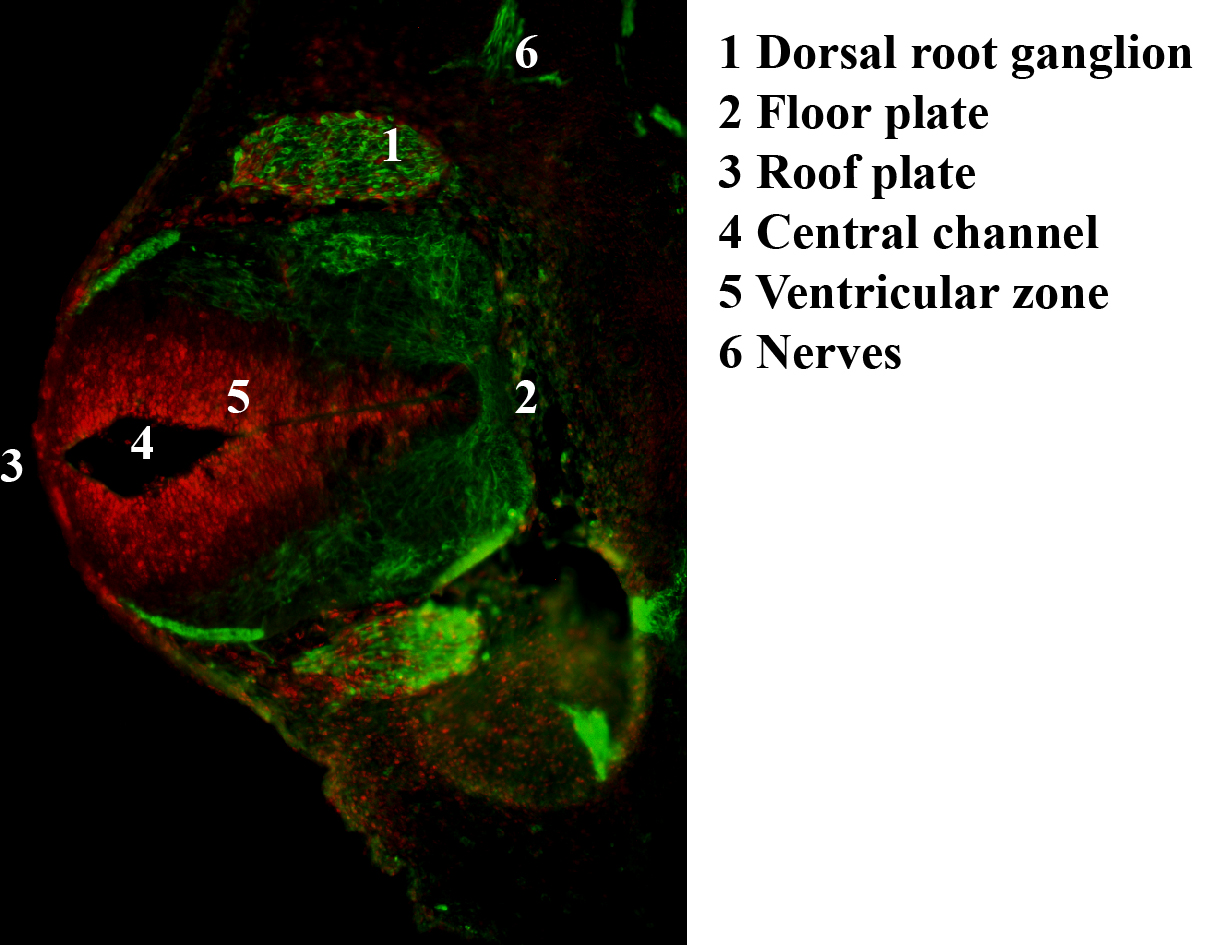
Immunofluorescent antibody staining against neurofilament (green) and Ki-67 (red) in a mouse embryo 12.5 days after fertilization. The proliferating cells are in the ventricular zone in the neural tube and therefore colored red.

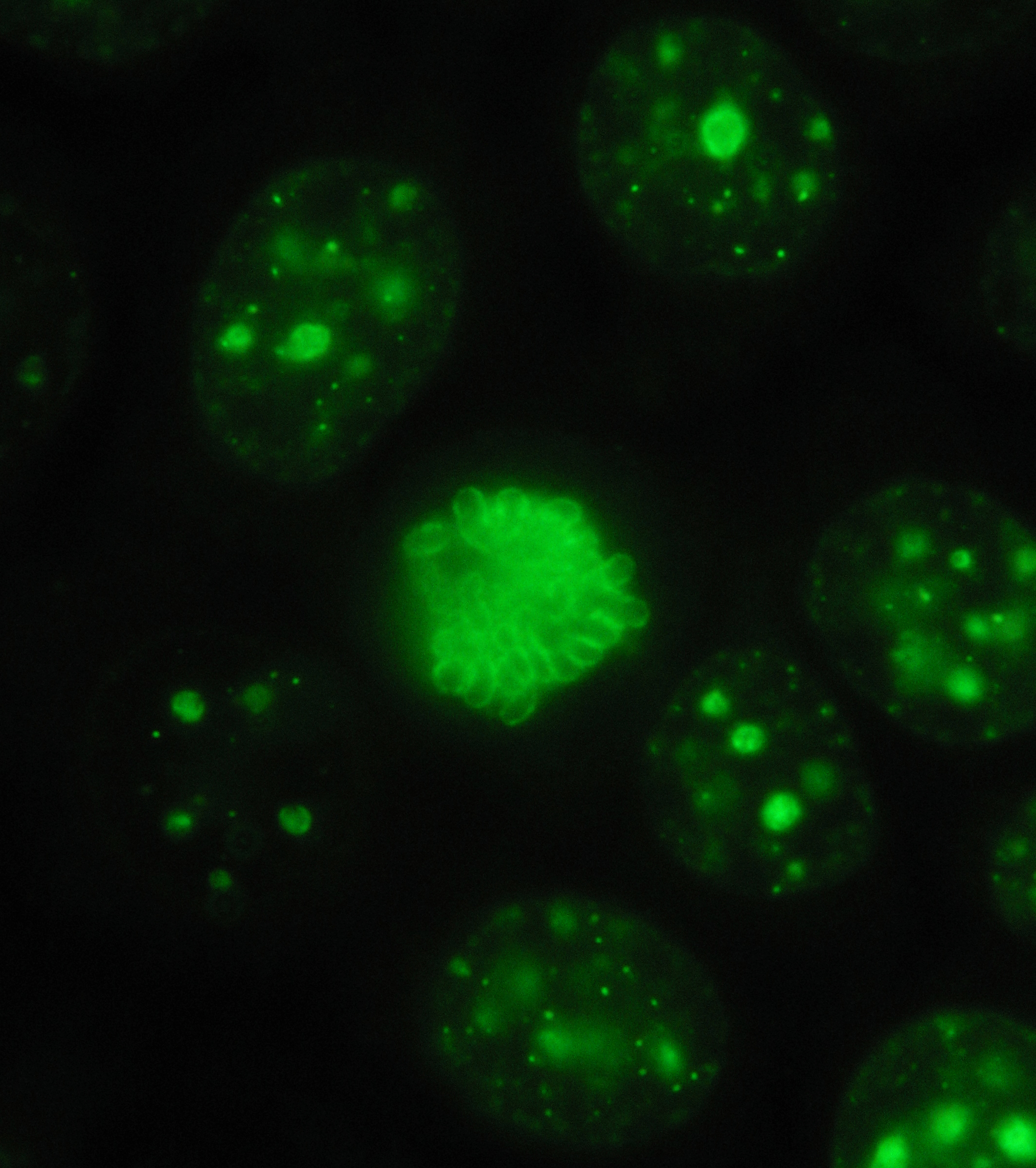
Protein Ki-67 in human MCF-7 cells

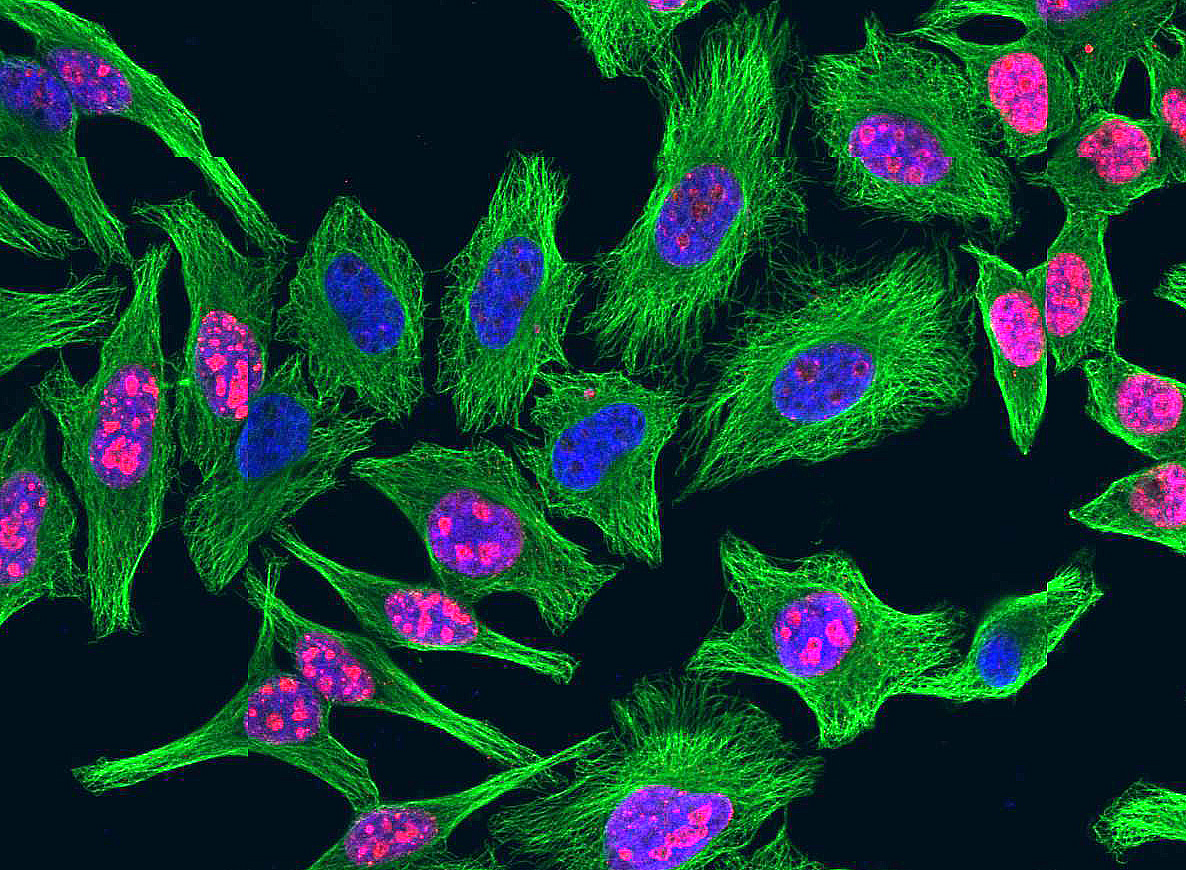
Ki-67 protein (red), tubulin (green) and DNA (blue) in HeLa cells. Dividing cells show strong Ki-67 staining in cell nuclei while all cells contain large amounts of tubulin, the major component of microtubules. Antibodies, cell staining and image courtesy of EnCor Biotechnology.
