= Chromo shadow domain =

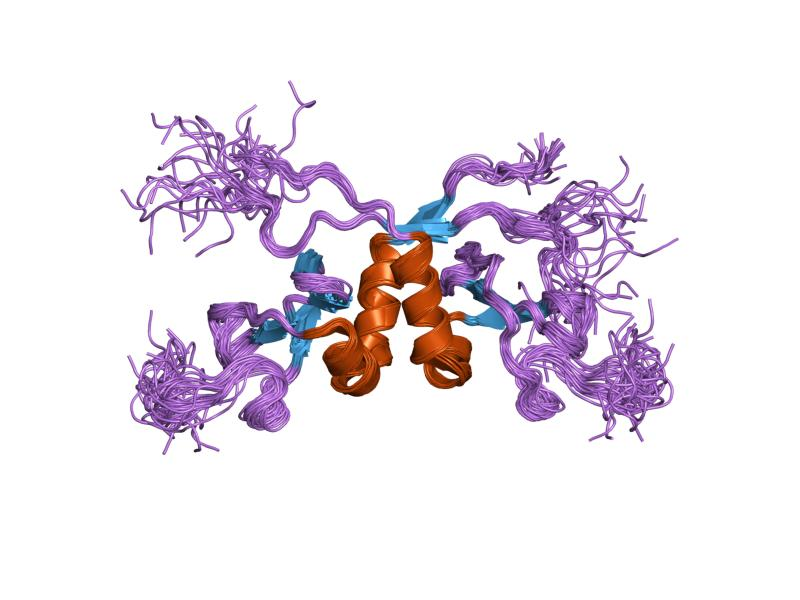
- hp1 chromo shadow domain in complex with pxvxl motif of caf-1

Identifiers
- Symbol: Chromo_shadow
- Pfam: PF01393
- Pfam clan: CL0049
- InterPro: IPR008251
- SCOP2: 1e0b / SCOPe / SUPFAM
- CDD: cd00034
Available protein structures:
- PDB: IPR008251 PF01393 (ECOD; PDBsum)
- AlphaFold: IPR008251; PF01393

In molecular biology, the chromo shadow domain is a protein domain which is distantly related to the chromodomain. It is always found in association with a chromodomain. Proteins containing a chromo shadow domain include Drosophila and human heterochromatin protein Su(var)205 (HP1); and mammalian modifier 1 and modifier 2.

Chromo shadow domains self-aggregate, bringing together the nucleosomes to which their proteins are bound and thus condense the chromatin region they are associated with. Condensed chromatin is not able to be transcribed, as the transcription factors and enzymes are not able to access to DNA sequence in this form. Hence, chromo shadow domain-containing proteins repress gene transcription.
