= Turecki =

Turecki may refer to:

- Turek County
- Gustavo Turecki (born 1965), Canadian psychiatrist and professor
