= Stress dysregulation =

Various types of stress dysregulation are described in articles on:

- Adrenal insufficiency
- Emotional dysregulation
- Epigenetics of anxiety and stress–related disorders
- Transgenerational stress inheritance
