= Epigenetics of autism =

Field of study

Epigenetics of autism is the study of heritable changes in gene expression that do not alter the genetic code but may contribute to the development and variability of autism spectrum disorder (ASD). Autism tends to have a strong correlation with genetics along with other factors. Epigenetics generally refers to the ways in which chromatin structure is altered to affect gene expression, which includes mechanisms such as cytosine regulation and post-translational modifications of histones. The connection between epigenetics and autism is not fully known. Of the 215 genes contributing, to some extent in autism, 42 have been found to be involved in epigenetic modification of gene expression.

Diagnosis is based on observation of behavior and development. Many, especially girls and those who have fewer social difficulties, may have been misdiagnosed with other conditions. Males are diagnosed with autism four to five times more often than females. The reasons for this remain predominantly unclear, but current hypotheses include a higher testosterone level in utero, different presentations of characteristics in females (leading to misdiagnosis or underdiagnosis) compared to males, and gender bias. Clinical assessment of children can involve a variety of individuals, including the caregiver(s), the child, and a core team of professionals (pediatricians, child psychiatrists, speech-and-language therapists and clinical/educational psychologists). For adult diagnosis, clinicians identify neurodevelopmental history, behaviors, difficulties in communication, limited interests and problems in education, employment, and social relationships. Challenging behaviors may be assessed with functional analysis to identify the triggers causing them. The sex and gender disparity in autism diagnostics requires further research in terms of adding diagnosis specifiers as well as female-oriented examples, which may be masked through camouflaging behaviors. Camouflaging is defined as a coping mechanism used in social situations, consisting of individuals pretending to be other people without any communication difficulties. Because of camouflaging and other societal factors, autistic females are more likely to be diagnosed late or with a different mental health concern. In general, it is critical for people to understand that the female autism phenotype is less noticeable, especially when they present as "higher functioning" than other autistic people. Lastly, due to the imbalance in sexes participating in autism studies, the literature is potentially biased towards the ways that it presents in male individuals.

Autism is considered a lifelong condition and has no "cure." Many professionals, advocates, and people in the autistic community agree that a cure is not the answer and efforts should instead focus on methods to help autistic people have happier, healthier, and, if possible, independent lives. Support efforts include teaching social and behavioral skills, monitoring, factoring-in co-existing conditions, and guidance for the caregivers, family, educators, and employers. There is no specific medication for autism, however, drugs can be prescribed for other co-existing mental health conditions, such as anxiety. A study in 2019 found that the management of challenging behaviors was generally of low quality, with little support for long-term usage of psychotropic drugs, and concerns about their inappropriate prescription. Genetic research has improved the understanding of autism-related molecular pathways. Animal research has pointed to the reversibility of phenotypes but the studies are at an early stage.

== Genetic and epigenetic overlap ==
The etiology of Autism Spectrum Disorders (ASDs) is complex and involves the interaction of inherited genetic mutations and newly acquired epigenetic changes. Although epigenetic disorders may not be present per se, they serve as a “second hit” that serves to alter the expression of genetic predispositions. Environmental factors may serve to cause epigenetic changes that interact with common and rare copy number variants (CNVs) and single nucleotide variants (SNVs) in genes that are important for brain development and the formation of synapses, which may affect the degree of neurological and anatomical abnormalities that are present in ASDs.

== Cortical hyperexcitability and autism ==
One of the leading theories of a potential pathogenic process in autism is cortical hyperexcitability. Maintaining proper levels of cortical excitability is essential for many important cognitive functions, such as processing sensory information, communication between different regions of the brain, and neural plasticity. Hyperexcitability can disrupt these functions and thereby alter cognitive dynamism in important ways. For example, cortical hyperexcitability can affect how the duration of sensory stimuli are perceived. A common trait of autism is reduced somatosensory functioning, which has been linked to alterations in cortical hyperexcitability in autistic individuals. Cortical hyperexcitability can also alter how "old" and "new" stimuli are perceived by changing habituation and adaptation processes in the brain. Altered habituation processes have been linked to characteristic traits of autism, such as under-responsiveness to some stimuli and over-responsiveness to others.

There are many genetic and epigenetic factors that can contribute to increased excitability, but one of the mechanisms implicated in autism is alterations in GABAergic systems in the cortex. GABA is the main neurotransmitter implicated in inhibition in the cortex of mammalian brains; changes to this cortical inhibitory system can result in increased excitability. Alterations in this system have been associated not only with autism but also with several other psychiatric conditions, such as major depressive disorder (MDD) and schizophrenia.

Alterations in the GABAergic system can occur through several epigenetic mechanisms, including modification of chromosome 15q11 to q13 regions which cause reduced levels of GABA signaling. Cortical excitability can also be increased by modifications in the glutamatergic system.

=== Chromosome 15q11-13 and GABA signaling ===
Chromosome 15q11-13 contain genes encoding subunits of GABA receptors, and both deletion and duplication of this region can lead to cortical hyperexcitability. Duplications of 15q11-13 are associated with about 5% of autistic people and about 1% of people diagnosed with classical autism. 15q11-13 in humans contains a cluster of genetically imprinted genes related to neurodevelopment. Like other genetically imprinted genes, the parent of origin determines the phenotypes associated with 15q11-13 duplications. "Parent of origin effects" cause gene expression to occur only from one of the two copies of alleles that individuals receive from their parents. (For example, MKRN3 shows a parent of origin effect and is paternally imprinted. This means that only the MKRN3 allele received from the paternal side will be expressed.) Duplications in the maternal copy lead to a distinct condition that often includes autism.

Genes that are deficient in paternal or maternal 15q11-13 alleles result in Prader-Willi or Angelman syndromes, respectively, both of which are linked to high incidence of autism. Overexpression of maternally imprinted genes is predicted to cause autism, which focuses attention to the maternally expressed genes on 15q11-13, although it is still possible that alterations in the expression of both imprinted and bilallelically expressed genes contribute to these conditions. The commonly duplicated region of chromosome 15 also includes paternally imprinted genes that can be considered candidates for autism.

==== GABA_{A} receptor genes on 15q11-13 ====
Members of the GABA receptor family, especially GABRB3, are attractive candidate genes for Autism because of their function in the nervous system. GABRB3 null mice exhibit behaviors consistent with autism and multiple genetic studies have found significant evidence for association. Furthermore, a significant decrease in abundance of GABRB3 has been reported in the brains of autistic people and people with Rett syndrome. Other GABA receptors residing on different chromosomes have also been associated with autism (e.g. GABRA4 and GABRB1 on chromosome 4p).

==== Epigenetic regulation of gene expression in 15q11-13 ====
Regulation of gene expression in the 15q11-13 is rather complex and involves a variety of mechanisms such as DNA methylation, non-coding and anti-sense RNA.

The imprinted genes of 15q11-13 are under the control of a common regulatory sequence, the imprinting control region (ICR). The ICR is a differentially methylated CpG island at the 5' end of SNRPN. It is heavily methylated on the silent maternal allele and unmethylated on the active paternal allele.

MeCP2, which is a candidate gene for Rett syndrome, has been shown to affect regulation of expression in 15q11-13. Altered (decreased) expression of UBE3A and GABRB3 is observed in MeCP2 deficient mice and autistic people. This effect seems to happen without MeCP2 directly binding to the promoters of UBE3A and GABRB3. (Mechanism unknown) However, chromatin immunoprecipitation and bisulfite sequencing have demonstrated that MeCP2 binds to methylated CpG sites within GABRB3 and the promoter of SNRPN/SNURF.

Furthermore, homologous 15q11-13 pairing in neurons that is disrupted in RTT and autistic people, has been shown to depend on MeCP2. Combined, these data suggest a role for MeCP2 in the regulation of imprinted and biallelic genes in 15q11-13. However, evidently, it does not play a role in the maintenance of imprinting.

== Folate-methionine pathway enzymes ==
One current theory of the pathophysiology of autism is that it arises from a deficit in the folate-methionine pathway. Folate donates methyl groups to convert homocysteine into methionine, which is the precursor of S-adenosylmethionine. S-adenosylmethionine is the methyl group donor responsible for DNA and histone methylation. Epigenetic changes can result in changed gene expression of pathway enzymes resulting in a change in folate levels which can contribute to autism. These changes to the epigenetic regulation interact with the pregnant woman's immune system activation and can result in an autism phenotype in the fetus' brain. To add, low levels of folate in the pregnant woman are correlated with DNA hypomethylation in the fetus.

The gene MTHFR codes for the enzyme methylenetetrahydrofolate reductase which is necessary for the synthesis of 5-methyl-tetrahydrofolate, a biologically active form of folate One important factor that has been identified for autism is polymorphism in MTHFR. A meta-analysis demonstrated that polymorphism of the MTHFR C677T genotype is correlated with an autism diagnosis in children from countries lacking food fortification.

While MTHFR is a proposed genetic factor for autism, there is limited clinical evidence from testing for MTHFR gene polymorphisms in the diagnostic setting. The reason for these complications may be due to other modifiers of the folate metabolism pathway or other genes included in the pathway. Additionally, the levels of homocysteine (HCy) seem to result in an increased utility of the folate metabolism pathway as a predictor for autism diagnosis.

== Pharmacological inducers and glial cells ==
Some of the pharmacological agents known to increase the risk of ASD in the fetus when taken by pregnant mothers include valproic acid (valproate), which has been strongly associated with ASD in the fetus. Valproate is known to function as a histone deacetylase (HDAC) inhibitor, leading to significant epigenetic changes in the fetus. Although valproate-induced epigenetic changes in the fetus have been traditionally known to influence neurons, such changes uniquely and severely impair glial cells such as astrocytes, microglial cells, and oligodendrocytes. The dysfunction of glial cells following epigenetic changes leads to neuroinflammation, which in turn interferes with normal fetal development and causes ASD.

Candidate genes for autism in mice fetuses following in utero valproate exposure: NRXN1, NRXN2, NRXN3, NLGN1, NLGN2, and NLGN3. In the somatosensory cortex, CA1, dentate gyrus, and hippocampus of mice fetuses following in utero valproate exposure, there is significant downregulation of NLGN3. Although this study on the downregulation of NLGN3 following valproate exposure in mice fetuses has provided evidence on the possible mechanism of ASD in mice fetuses following valproate exposure in utero, further study is required on this topic.

Romidepsin and MS-275, both HDAC inhibitors, improve social preference, which is the preference of social stimuli over non social stimuli, and interaction times of SHANK 3 deficient mice. Trichostatin A (TSA) is another example of an HDAC inhibitor. It results in increased histone acetylation at the oxytocin and vasopressin receptors of the nucleus accumbens (NA) in female voles, increasing pair bonding. In a small clinical trial, beta hydroxybutyrate, a product of the ketogenic diet and inhibitor of class 1 HDACs, has shown promise in improving the social behavior and skills in autistic children.'The inhibition of HDAC is correlated with overexpression of other genes. Treatment of mice with valproate also increases hippocampal histone H3 acetylation.

Current candidate genes relating to autism in mice exposed to valproate in utero are NRXN1, NRXN2, NRXN3, NLGN1, NLGN2, and NLGN3. In the somatosensory cortex, CA1, dentate gyrus, and hippocampus, NLGN3 is significantly downregulated in mice treated with valproate. While this evidence of NLGN3 downregulation due to valproate suggests a potential relevant mechanism for autism, further research is needed.

== Genes linked to autism and other conditions ==
=== Phelan-McDermid syndrome, schizophrenia, and autism ===
SHANK proteins are scaffolding proteins at glutamatergic synapses crucial for synaptic development. The disruption of SHANK genes is associated with neurocognitive impairments and conditions. The disruptions, either from mutations or deletions, are associated with conditions such as Phelan-McDermid syndrome (PMS), schizophrenia, and autism. SHANK 3 is the most studied gene from the SHANK gene family. Several studies have found that disruptions to SHANK 3 cause more severe cognitive impairments than disruptions to SHANK 1 or 2. These findings suggest that the SHANK gene that is disrupted may determine the severity of the cognitive impairments.

A study on two mutant mice lines, one line with an autism-linked SHANK 3 mutation on exon 21 and the other with a schizophrenia-linked SHANK 3 mutation on exon 21, found differences in the synaptic and behavioral impairments caused by disruptions to SHANK 3. The autism-linked mutation results in a complete loss of SHANK 3 (like a deletion) and impaired striatal synaptic transmission. The schizophrenia-linked mutation results in a truncated SHANK 3 protein and severe synaptic impairments in the prefrontal cortex.

Other studies suggest that SHANK3 knockout mice display behavioral phenotypes of autism. These mice display self-injurious grooming, anxiety, and social difficulties. Restoration of SHANK 3 in adult mice improved social difficulties and self-grooming behaviors. These findings indicate the potential therapeutic effect of restoring SHANK 3. SHANK 3 restoration may alleviate some characteristics of autism. In addition, modulators and proteins associated with SHANK 3 are potential therapeutic targets for autism. However, the effects of targeting modulators differ depending on the specific SHANK 3 disruption. For instance, studies have shown that increasing mGluR5 activity improved self grooming and behavioral differences. Yet, other studies have shown the opposite effect. This demonstrates that the therapeutic effects are dependent on specific SHANK 3 mutation.

== Environmental and postnatal triggers ==
Various environmental factors have been identified that can alter the epigenome and contribute to the development of ASD. Research indicates that prenatal factors, such as maternal diet and maternal immune activation (for example, resulting from maternal asthma), can significantly interact with fetal epigenetic mechanisms. There is also evidence from animal models suggesting the possibility of transgenerational epigenetic inheritance, where exposure to environmental stressors in one generation may affect the neurodevelopment of subsequent generations.

=== Early-life stress and the HPA axis ===
Postnatal environmental factors, particularly early-life stress (ELS), can also become biologically embedded via epigenetic changes. Stressors such as abuse, neglect, or extreme poverty can cause epigenetic modifications that affect the hypothalamic-pituitary-adrenal (HPA) axis, the body's central stress response system. ELS has been shown to induce epigenetic changes in several well-known autism candidate genes involved in the HPA axis, including NR3C1, FKBP5, MECP2, GAD1, and BDNF. These modifications can push the neurodevelopmental system toward a heightened excitatory state, illustrating a mechanistic overlap between environmental trauma and the genetic traits of ASD.

== Autism and the X chromosome ==
There is a definite gender bias in the distribution of autism. There are about four times as many affected males across the autistic population. Even when people with mutations in X-linked genes (MECP2 and FMR1) are excluded, the gender bias remains. However, when only looking at people with the most severe cognitive impairment, the gender bias is not as extreme. While the most obvious conclusion is that an X-linked gene of major effect is involved in contributing to autism, the mechanism appears to be much more complex and perhaps epigenetic in origin.

Based on the results of a study on females with Turner syndrome, a hypothesis involving epigenetic mechanisms was proposed to help describe the gender bias of autism. People with Turner syndrome have only one X chromosome which can be either maternal or paternal in origin. When 80 females with monosomy X were tested for measures of social cognition, the people with a paternally derived X chromosome performed better than those with a maternally derived X chromosome. Males have only one X chromosome, derived from their mother. If a gene on the paternal X chromosome confers improved social skills, males are deficient in the gene. This could explain why males are more likely to be diagnosed with autism.

In the proposed model, the candidate gene is silenced on the maternal copy of the X chromosome. Thus, males do not express this gene and are more susceptible to subsequent difficulties in social and communication skills. Females, on the other hand, are more resistant to autism. Recently a cluster of imprinted genes on the mouse X chromosome was discovered; the paternal allele was expressed while the female copy was imprinted and silenced. Further studies are aimed at discovering whether these genes contribute directly to behavior and whether the counterpart genes in humans are imprinted.

== The link to Rett syndrome ==
Epigenetic alterations of the methylation states of genes such as MECP2 and EGR2 have been shown to play a role in autism. MECP2 anomalies have been shown to lead to a wide range of phenotypic variability and molecular complexities. These variabilities have led to the exploration of the clinical and molecular convergence between Rett syndrome and autism.

Sleeping and language impairments, seizures, and developmental timing are common in both autism and Rett syndrome (RTT). Because of these phenotypic similarities, there has been research into the specific genetic similarities between these two neurodevelopmental conditions. MECP2 has been identified as the predominant gene involved in RTT. It has also been shown that the regulation of the MECP2 gene expression has been implicated in autism. Rett syndrome brain samples and autism brain samples show immaturity of dendrite spines and reduction of cell-body size due to errors in coupled regulation between MECP2 and EGR2. However, because of the multigene involvement in autism, the MECP2 gene has only been identified as a vulnerability factor in autism. The most current model illustrating MECP2 is known as the transcriptional activator model.

Another potential molecular convergence involves the early growth response gene-2 (EGR2). EGR2 is the only gene in the EGR family that is restricted to the central nervous system and is involved in cerebral development and synaptic plasticity. EGR2 expression has been shown to decrease in the cortexes of individuals with both autism and RTT. MECP2 expression has also been shown to decrease in individuals with RTT and autism. MECP2 and EGR2 have been shown to regulate each other during neuronal maturation. A role for the dysregulation of the activity-dependent EGR2/MECP2 pathway in RTT and autism has been proposed. Further molecular linkages are being examined; however, the exploration of MECP2 and EGR2 have provided a common link between RTT, autism, and similarities in phenotypic expression.

== Developmental timeline and diagnostic potential ==
Multi-level analyses of epigenetic drift, age acceleration, and rare epivariations suggest that the majority of significant epigenetic alterations associated with ASD occur during early fetal development, a period characterized by high rates of neuronal replication. Recent research has identified a significant epigenetic signature for ASD in peripheral blood samples. While further study is required, these findings provide concrete evidence that analyzing epigenetic markers in peripheral blood could eventually serve as a viable, non-invasive diagnostic tool for early identification of the disorder.

== Potential applications of epigenetic research to treatment of autism ==
Folate pathways have been studied to be potential predictors of autism. A few genetic polymorphisms such as folate hydrolase 1 and hydroxymethyltransferase 1 along with hyperhomocysteinemia were used as factors contributing to autism to develop an artificial neural network (ANN). Studies showed that this model was around 63.8% accurate in predicting autism likelihood, implying a moderate association between genetic polymorphisms of the folate pathway and autism likelihood. *8*

The most important methyl donor for DNA methylation is 5-methyl-tetrahydrofolate. Consequently, any changes in folate levels or folate metabolism could significantly impact DNA methylation and contribute to what causes autism. This idea is what makes folate pathways a potential predictor of autism because genetic polymorphisms of the folate pathway could have different effects on DNA methylation. In general, lower folate levels in pregnant women have been associated with increased autism likelihood. The effect of enhancing folate levels on the features of autism are still being researched and have yet to be confirmed.

== See also ==
- Causes of autism
- Heritability of autism
- Behavioral epigenetics
- Gene–environment interaction
