= Michael Meaney =

Canadian neuroscientist (born 1951)

Michael J. Meaney, CM, CQ, FRSC, (born 1951) is a professor at McGill University specializing in biological psychiatry, neurology, and neurosurgery, who is primarily known for his research on stress, maternal care, and gene expression. His research team has "discovered the importance of maternal care in modifying the expression of genes that regulate behavioral and neuroendocrine responses to stress, as well as hippocampal synaptic development" in animal studies. The research has implications for domestic and public policy for maternal support and its role in human disease prevention and economic health.

Meaney is associate director of the Research Centre at the Douglas Mental Health University Institute, director of the Program for the Study of Behaviour, Genes and Environment, and James McGill Professor, Departments of Psychiatry and Neurology and Neurosurgery, McGill University. He was named a "Most Highly Cited Scientist" in the area of neuroscience by the Institute for Scientific Information in 2007 and was also elected to the Royal Society of Canada and named a Knight of the National Order of Quebec. For research on stress he has received a Senior Scientist Career Award from the Canadian Institutes of Health Research in 1997. He also, along with fellow researcher from the Douglas Institute Dr. Gustavo Turecki, was awarded the Scientist of the Year Award by Radio-Canada. In 2011, he was made a member of the Order of Canada.

== Animal studies ==
Meaney is an expert in stress and epigenetics, with hundreds of papers and thousands of citations culminating in a h-index of 135 as of 2019. Meaney has studied the epigenetic effects of stressors ranging from aversive early life experience to obesity. His early research focused on the relationship between maternal care and stress response in rat pups. This work demonstrated that pups removed from their maternal environment and handled for 15 minutes per day had lower hypothalamic-pituitary-adrenal responses than pups separated from their mothers for 3 hours per day and pups with no handling whatsoever. Meaney hypothesized that these changes were related to glucocorticoid receptor density and its role in hypothalamic-pituitary-adrenal axis feedback. Meaney and colleagues tested his hypothesis by examining the effect of maternal care on GR expression. They separated mother rats into two groups: high licking and grooming mothers and low licking and grooming mothers. Pups of high licking and grooming mothers had a significantly greater density of glucocorticoid receptors in their hippocampi than pups of low licking and grooming mothers. This research was the first to establish a causational relationship between maternal care and behavioral epigenetic programming by cross fostering pups. Meaney also studied this causal relationship between maternal care and epigenetic programming in estrogen receptor expression in the medial pre-optic area of the brain. The behavioral results showed that high licking and grooming mothers birth pups that grow to be high licking and grooming mothers, even with cross fostering. Meaney's animal research and hypotheses are broadly applicable, showing similar results when applied to humans.

== Human studies ==
Meaney's early research provided impetus for applied behavioral epigenetic research in humans. His first study compared suicidal subjects with a history of child abuse to suicidal subjects without a history of child abuse. Meaney found further evidence to support his hippocampal glucocorticoid receptor hypothesis when he discovered that abuse victims had less expression of hippocampal glucocorticoid receptors than both non-abused suicide victims and non-suicidal subjects. This suggests that childhood abuse alters the hippocampus in a way that is related to suicidal behavior.

== Publications ==
- Diorio J, Meaney MJ (July 2007). "Maternal programming of defensive responses through sustained effects on gene expression" (PDF). J Psychiatry Neurosci. 32 (4): 275–84. PMC 1911190. PMID 17653296.
- McGowan PO, Sasaki A, Huang TC, Unterberger A, Suderman M, Ernst C, Meaney MJ, Turecki G, Szyf M (2008). "Promoter-wide hypermethylation of the ribosomal RNA gene promoter in the suicide brain". PLOS ONE. 3 (5) e2085. Bibcode:2008PLoSO...3.2085M. doi:10.1371/journal.pone.0002085. PMC 2330072. PMID 18461137.
- Weaver IC, Meaney MJ, Szyf M (February 2006). "Maternal care effects on the hippocampal transcriptome and anxiety-mediated behaviors in the offspring that are reversible in adulthood". Proc. Natl. Acad. Sci. U.S.A. 103 (9): 3480–5. Bibcode:2006PNAS..103.3480W. doi:10.1073/pnas.0507526103. PMC 1413873. PMID 16484373.
- Weaver IC, Cervoni N, Champagne FA, D'Alessio AC, Sharma S, Seckl JR, Dymov S, Szyf M, Meaney MJ (August 2004). "Epigenetic programming by maternal behavior". Nat. Neurosci. 7 (8): 847–54. doi:10.1038/nn1276. PMID 15220929. S2CID 1649281.
- Meaney MJ (2001). "Maternal care, gene expression, and the transmission of individual differences in stress reactivity across generations". Annu. Rev. Neurosci. 24: 1161–92. doi:10.1146/annurev.neuro.24.1.1161. PMID 11520931.

== Books ==
- John T. Cacioppo; Gary G. Berntson; Ralph Adolphs; C. Sue Carter; Richard J. Davidson; Martha K. McClintock; Bruce S. McEwen; Michael J. Meaney; Daniel L. Schacter; Esther M. Sternberg; Stephen S. Suomi; Shelley E. Taylor, eds. (2002). Foundations in social neuroscience. Cambridge, Mass.: MIT Press. p. 1357. ISBN 978-0-262-53195-5.

== See also ==
- Epigenetics
- Douglas Hospital
