= Gustavo Turecki =

Canadian psychiatrist and academic

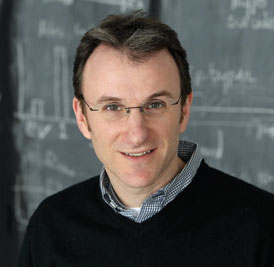
- Born: May 11, 1965 (age 61)
- Education: McGill University, Escola Paulista de Medicina
- Awards: Colvin Prize (2020); Margolese National Brain Disorders Prize (2019); Prix Léo-Pariseau, Acfas (2016); Heinz Lehmann Award, CCNP (2012)
- Website: https://mgss.ca, https://douglas.research.mcgill.ca

Gustavo Turecki (born May 11, 1965) is a Brazilian-Canadian psychiatrist, suicidologist, neuroscientist who is a professor at McGill University in Montreal, Quebec, Canada. He holds a Tier 1 Canada Research Chair Tier in Major Depressive Disorder and Suicide. He is the sitting Chair of the Department of Psychiatry at McGill University, the Scientific Director of the Douglas Research Centre, and the Psychiatrist-in-Chief of the Centre intégré universitaire de santé et de services sociaux de l’Ouest-de-l’Île-de-Montréal (CIUSSS ODIM). He works at the Douglas Mental Health University Institute, where he heads both the McGill Group for Suicide Studies and the Depressive Disorders Program, and is the co-director of the Douglas Bell-Canada Brain Bank.

Turecki is both a clinician and a neuroscientist. He has published over 500 peer-reviewed publications and 30 book chapters examining the influence of life experiences on brain function and their relationship to depression and suicide risk. One of his major contributions is the first description of the long-term impact of childhood abuse on the brain, particularly how it affects the activity of key genes involved in the stress response.

== Scientific contributions ==
Turecki's neurobiological work has focused on the processes underlying depression and suicide. In collaboration with Michael Meaney and Moshe Szyf, Turecki uncovered that early-life adversity epigenetically regulates the glucocorticoid receptor gene, a key component of response to stress. This study helped to reconcile debate about the relative influences of genes and environment on behaviour (‘nature vs. nurture’ debate), and led to Turecki's selection as the scientist of the year by Radio Canada/Canadian Broadcasting Corporation in 2009, along with Meaney and Szyf. Turecki's further research on the human brain explored the epigenetic control of genes related to stress-response systems, such as the hypothalamic-pituitary-adrenal (HPA) axis, particularly in association with childhood abuse and suicide. The results obtained in studying the epigenetic control of the HPA axis prompted Turecki to expand his interest in the epigenetic regulation of the brain, focusing on mechanisms that may explain what happens when individuals are exposed to traumatic experiences early in their lives, as well as what epigenetic processes are involved in depression and suicide. In addition, his work has focused on epigenetic mechanisms explaining response to antidepressants.

Turecki leads the Depressive Disorders Program, a clinical group that treats patients affected with major depression and integrates research projects into clinical practice. Two key aspects of this work are exploring how impulsive-aggressive behaviours contribute to suicide risk, and implementing novel protocols and standards in the field.

== Personal life ==
He was born in Argentina, moved to Brazil in the 1980s with his family, and moved to Montreal, Canada, in 1994.

== Awards and honours ==
Turecki is a fellow of the Canadian Academy of Health Sciences and a member of the American College of Neuropsychopharmacology.

- 2005 William Dawson Scholar, McGill University
- 2009 Scientist of the year Award, Radio Canada/CBC
- 2009 Top 10 findings of the year, Québec Science
- 2012 Heinz Lehmann Award, CCNP
- 2012 Research Career Award, American Foundation for Suicide Prevention
- 2014 Samarthji Lal Award for Mental Health Research, Graham Boeck Foundation
- 2014 Top 10 findings of the year, Québec Science
- 2015 Joel Elkes Award for Clinical Research, ACNP
- 2016 Léo-Pariseau Prize, Acfas
- 2016 Distinguished Investigator Award, NARSAD
- 2019 Margolese National Brain Disorders Prize, University of British Columbia
- 2020 Sumitomo/Sunovion Brain Health Clinical Research Award, CINP
- 2020 Colvin Prize in Mood Disorders Research, Brain & Behavior Research Foundation

== Selected publications ==
=== Neurobiology studies ===
- McGowan, P; Sasaki, A; D'Alessio, ACD; Dymov, S; Labonté, B; Szyf, M; Turecki, G; Meaney, M (2009). "Epigenetic regulation of the glucocorticoid receptor in human brain associates with childhood abuse". Nat Neurosci. 12 (3): 342–8. doi:10.1038/nn.2270. PMC 2944040. PMID 19234457.
- Labonté, B; Suderman, M; Maussion, G; Lopez, JP; Navarro-Sánchez, L; Yerko, V; Mechawar, N; Szyf, M; Meaney, MJ; Turecki, G (2013). "Genome-wide methylation changes in the brains of suicide completers". Am J Psychiatry. 170 (5): 511–20. doi:10.1176/appi.ajp.2012.12050627. PMID 23511308.
- Nagy, C; Suderman, M; Yang, J; Szyf, M; Mechawar, N; Ernst, C; Turecki, G (2014). "Astrocytic abnormalities and global DNA methylation patterns in depression and suicide". Mol Psychiatry. 20 (3): 320–328. doi:10.1038/mp.2014.21. PMC 5293540. PMID 24662927.
- Lopez, JP; Lim, R; Cruceanu, C; Crapper, L; Fasano, C; Labonte, B; Maussion, G; Yang, JP; Yerko, V; Vigneault, E; El Mestikawy, S; Mechawar, N; Pavlidis, P; Turecki, G (2014). "miR-1202 is a primate-specific and brain-enriched microRNA involved in major depression and antidepressant treatment". Nat Med. 20 (7): 764–8. doi:10.1038/nm.3582. PMC 4087015. PMID 24908571.
- Turecki, G (2014). "The molecular bases of the suicidal brain". Nat Rev Neurosci. 15 (12): 802–16. doi:10.1038/nrn3839. PMC 5293539. PMID 25354482.
- Turecki, G; Brent, DA (2016). "Suicide and suicidal behaviour". Lancet. 387 (10024): 1227–39. doi:10.1016/S0140-6736(15)00234-2. PMC 5319859. PMID 26385066.
- Lopez, JP; Fiori, LM; Cruceanu, C; Lin, R; Labonté, B; Cates, HM; Heller, EA; Vialou, V; Ku, SM; Gerald, C; Han, MH; Foster, J; Frey, BN; Soares, CN; Müller, DJ; Farzan, F; Leri, F; MacQueen, GM; Feilotter, H; Tyryshkin, K; Evans, KR; Giacobbe, P; Blier, P; Lam, RW; Milev, R; Parikh, SV; Rotzinger, S; Strother, SC; Lewis, CM; Aitchison, KJ; Wittenberg, GM; Mechawar, N; Nestler, EJ; Uher, R; Kennedy, SH; Turecki, G (2017). "MicroRNAs 146a/b-5 and 425-3p and 24-3p are markers of antidepressant response and regulate MAPK/Wnt-system genes". Nat Commun. 8 15497. Bibcode:2017NatCo...815497L. doi:10.1038/ncomms15497. PMC 5477510. PMID 28530238.
- Belzeaux, R; Gorgievski, V; Fiori, L; Lopez, JP; Grenier, J; Lin, R; Nagy, C; Ibrahim, EC; Gascon, E; Courtet, P; Richard-Devantoy, S; Berlim, M; Chachamovich, E; Theroux, J-F; Dumas, S; Giros, B; Rotzinger, S; Soares, C; Foster, J; Mechawar, N; Tall, G; Tzavara, E; Kennedy, SH; Turecki, G (2020). "GPR56/ADGRG1 is associated with response to antidepressant treatment". Nat Commun. 11 (1): 1635. Bibcode:2020NatCo..11.1635B. doi:10.1038/s41467-020-15423-5. PMC 7118175. PMID 32242018.
- Turecki, G; Brent, DA; Gunnell, D; O'Connor, RC; Oquendo, MA; Pirkis, J; Stanley, BH (2019). "Suicide and suicide risk". Nat Rev Dis Primers. 5 (1): 74. doi:10.1038/s41572-019-0121-0. hdl:11343/238591. PMID 31649257. S2CID 204861215.
- Labonté, B; Abdallah, K; Maussion, G; Yerko, V; Yang, J; Bittar, T; Quessy, F; Golden, SA; Navarro, L; Checknita, D; Gigek, C; Lopez, JP; Neve, RL; Russo, SJ; Tremblay, RE; Côté, G; Meaney, MJ; Mechawar, N; Nestler, EJ; Turecki, G (2020). "Regulation of impulsive and aggressive behaviours by a novel lncRNA". Mol Psychiatry. 26 (8): 3751–3764. doi:10.1038/s41380-019-0637-4. PMC 7436429. PMID 31907380.
- Nagy, C; Maitra, M; Tanti, A; Suderman, M; Theroux, J-F; Davoli, MA; Perlman, K; Yerko, V; Wang, YC; Tripathy, S; Pavlidis, P; Mechawar, N; Ragoussis, J; Turecki, G (2020). "Single-nucleus transcriptomics of the prefrontal cortex in major depressive disorder implicates oligodendrocyte precursor cells and excitatory neurons". Nat Neurosci. 23 (6): 771–781. doi:10.1038/s41593-020-0621-y. hdl:1983/bb69c399-fc9e-4d37-8bb5-328aa8096ede. PMID 32341540. S2CID 216560590.

=== Clinical and behavioural studies of depression and suicide ===
- Dumais, A; Seguin, M; Lalovic, A; Lesage, A; Chawky, N; Roy, M; Benkelfat, C; Turecki, G (2005). "Behavioral risk factors for suicide in major depression". Am J Psychiatry. 162 (11): 2116–24. doi:10.1176/appi.ajp.162.11.2116. PMID 16263852.
- Brezo, J; Bureau, A; Mérette, C; Jomphe, V; Barker, ED; Vitaro, F; Hébert, M; Carbonneau, R; Tremblay, RE; Turecki, G (2009). "Differences and similarities in the serotonergic diathesis for suicide attempts and mood disorders: A 22-year longitudinal gene-environment study". Mol Psychiatry. 15 (8): 831–43. doi:10.1038/mp.2009.19. PMID 19381154.
- McGirr, A; Alda, M; Séguin, M; Cabot, S; Lesage, A; Turecki, G (2009). "Familial aggregation of suicide is explained by cluster B traits: A three-group family study of suicide controlling for major depressive disorder". Am J Psychiatry. 166 (10): 1124–34. doi:10.1176/appi.ajp.2009.08111744. PMID 19755577.
- Dalca, IM; McGirr, A; Renaud, J; Turecki, G (2013). "Gender-specific suicide risk factors: A case-control study of individuals with major depressive disorder". J Clin Psychiatry. 74 (12): 1209–1216. doi:10.4088/jcp.12m08180. PMID 24434089.
