= MAN2A1 =

Protein-coding gene in the species Homo sapiens

Identifiers
- Aliases: MAN2A1, AMan II, GOLIM7, MANA2, MANII, mannosidase alpha class 2A member 1
- External IDs: OMIM: 154582; MGI: 104669; GeneCards: MAN2A1
Enzyme activity
EC #	BRENDA	ExPASy	KEGG	MetaCyc
3.2.1.114	↗	↗	↗	↗

Gene location (Human)
Chr.	Chromosome 5 (human)
Band	5q21.3	Start	109,689,927 bp
Band	5q21.3	End	109,869,625 bp

Gene location (Mouse)
Chr.	Chromosome 17 (mouse)
Band	17|17 E1.1	Start	64,907,731 bp
Band	17|17 E1.1	End	65,062,105 bp
RNA expression pattern
Bgee	Human / Mouse (ortholog); Top expressed in: corpus callosum; Achilles tendon; jejunal mucosa; inferior ganglion of vagus nerve; stromal cell of endometrium; retinal pigment epithelium; endothelial cell; C1 segment; mucosa of sigmoid colon; duodenum / Top expressed in: stroma of bone marrow; lacrimal gland; decidua; seminal vesicula; gastrula; vestibular membrane of cochlear duct; efferent ductule; left lobe of liver; Paneth cell; dermis; More reference expression data
BioGPS	n/a
Gene ontology
Molecular function	mannosidase activity; hydrolase activity, hydrolyzing N-glycosyl compounds; hydrolase activity, acting on glycosyl bonds; metal ion binding; catalytic activity; mannosyl-oligosaccharide 1,3-1,6-alpha-mannosidase activity; hydrolase activity; carbohydrate binding; alpha-mannosidase activity
Cellular component	integral component of membrane; Golgi apparatus; membrane; Golgi membrane; cis-Golgi network; extracellular exosome; extracellular space; Golgi medial cisterna
Biological process	N-glycan processing; mitochondrion organization; vacuole organization; in utero embryonic development; protein deglycosylation; respiratory gaseous exchange by respiratory system; positive regulation of neurogenesis; retina morphogenesis in camera-type eye; protein glycosylation; liver development; lung alveolus development; metabolism; mannose metabolic process; carbohydrate metabolic process
Sources:Amigo / QuickGO
Orthologs
Databases	NCBI: entry; OMA: entry
Species	Human	Mouse
Entrez	4124	17158
Ensembl	ENSG00000112893	ENSMUSG00000024085
UniProt	Q16706	P27046
RefSeq (mRNA)	NM_002372	NM_008549
RefSeq (protein)	NP_002363	NP_032575
Location (UCSC)	Chr 5: 109.69 – 109.87 Mb	Chr 17: 64.91 – 65.06 Mb
PubMed search
- Wikidata
View/Edit Human	View/Edit Mouse

Alpha-mannosidase 2 is an enzyme that in humans is encoded by the MAN2A1 gene.

== Function ==
This gene encodes a protein which is a member of family 38 of the glycosyl hydrolases. The protein is located in the Golgi apparatus and catalyzes the final hydrolytic step in the asparagine-linked oligosaccharide (N-linked glycosylation) maturation pathway. Mutations in the mouse homolog of this gene have been shown to cause a systemic autoimmune disease similar to human systemic lupus erythematosus.
