= Moshe Szyf =

American geneticist

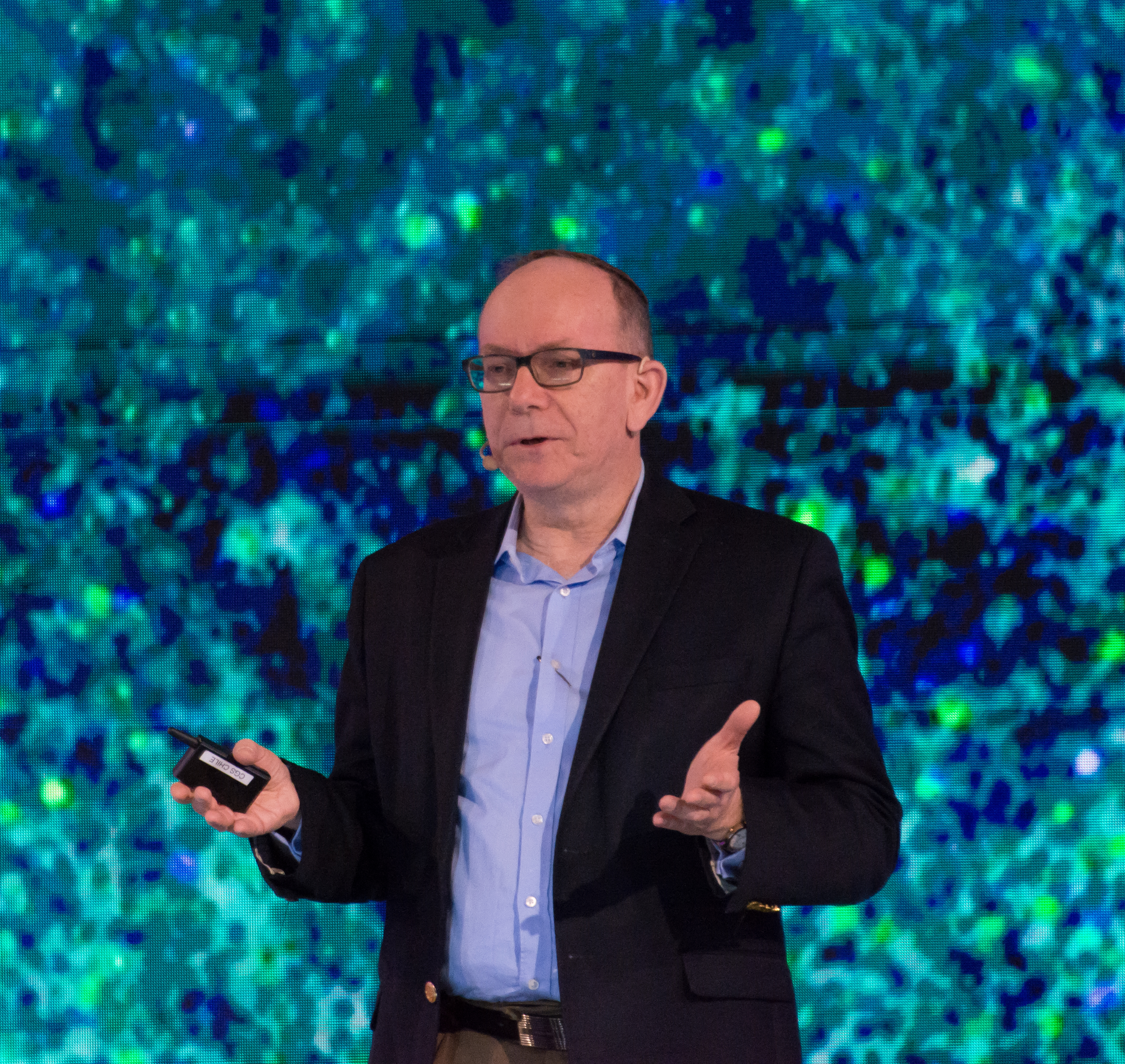
- Scientific career
- Fields: Epigenetics and cancer research
- Institutions: McGill University

Moshe Szyf is a geneticist and professor of pharmacology and therapeutics at McGill University, where he also holds a GlaxoSmithKline-CIHR chair in pharmacology.

Szyf's main research interests lie with epigenetics, including behavioral epigenetics as well as cancer research.

== Education and career ==
Szyf received his Ph.D. from the Hebrew University on basic mechanisms of DNA methylation under the supervision of Aharon Razin. Subsequently, he performed postdoctoral work at Harvard Medical School. In 1989, he was appointed as assistant professor in the department of Pharmacology and Therapeutics at McGill University in Montreal, Canada. In 2016, Moshe Szyf founded Montreal EpiTerapia Inc. in Canada and HKG Epitherapeutics in Hong Kong in order to develop novel tools for the early detection of cancer and promoting healthy aging.

== Publications ==
Books

- Moshe Szyf, DNA Methylation and Cancer Therapy, Springer, 2005, ISBN 978-0306478482
- Moshe Szyf, Fundamentals of Epigenetics, Cambridge University Press, ISBN 978-0521898379

Articles

As of April 2019, Moshe Szyf published 295 papers in peer-reviewed journals, almost all on epigenetics with a focus on cancer until the early 2000s and mostly environmental factors thereafter. He is a member of the editorial board of the journal Environmental Epigenetics, published by Oxford University Press.

Szyf also holds many patents, all relating to epigenetics-based therapeutics.
