= C17H22N2O3 =

The molecular formula C_{17}H_{22}N_{2}O_{3} (molar mass: 302.368 g/mol) may refer to:

- Emivirine (MKC-442)
- Trichostatin A
