= Emivirine =

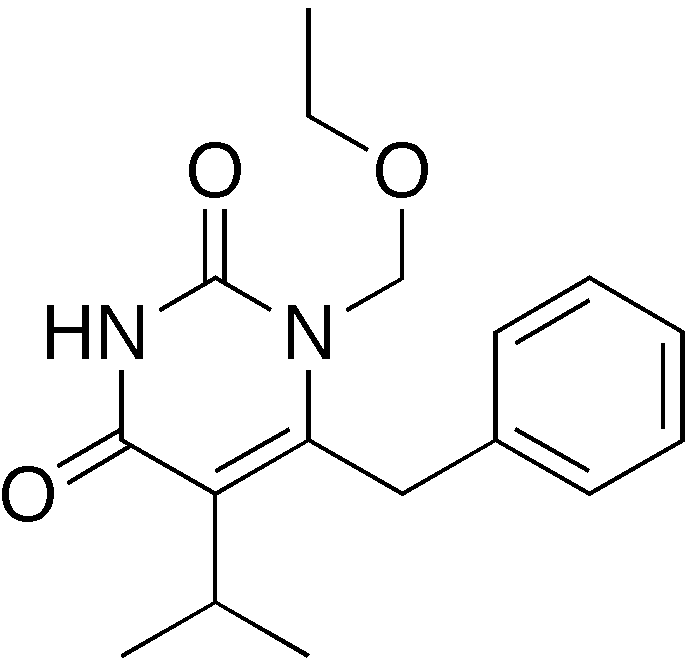

Names
- Preferred IUPAC name 6-Benzyl-1-(ethoxymethyl)-5-(propan-2-yl)pyrimidine-2,4(1H,3H)-dione
- Other names MKC-442

Identifiers
CAS Number	149950-60-7
3D model (JSmol)	Interactive image
ChEMBL	ChEMBL35033
ChemSpider	58529
PubChem CID	65013
UNII	X87G8IX72O
CompTox Dashboard (EPA)	DTXSID80164437
- InChI: InChI=1S/C17H22N2O3/c1-4-22-11-19-14(10-13-8-6-5-7-9-13)15(12(2)3)16(20)18-17(19)21/h5-9,12H,4,10-11H2,1-3H3,(H,18,20,21) Key: MLILORUFDVLTSP-UHFFFAOYSA-N; InChI=1/C17H22N2O3/c1-4-22-11-19-14(10-13-8-6-5-7-9-13)15(12(2)3)16(20)18-17(19)21/h5-9,12H,4,10-11H2,1-3H3,(H,18,20,21) Key: MLILORUFDVLTSP-UHFFFAOYAG
- SMILES: CCOCN1C(=C(C(=O)NC1=O)C(C)C)CC2=CC=CC=C2

Properties
Chemical formula	C_{17}H_{22}N_{2}O_{3}
Molar mass	302.374 g·mol^{−1}
- Except where otherwise noted, data are given for materials in their standard state (at 25 °C [77 °F], 100 kPa). verify (what is ?) Infobox references

Emivirine (MKC-442) is a failed experimental agent for the treatment of HIV. It is a non-nucleoside reverse transcriptase inhibitor. While emivirine showed promising antiviral activity in vitro, it failed to show sufficient efficacy in human trials. However it is still notable as an early proof of concept, which led to the discovery of a number of related antiviral drugs.
