= Merlin Crossley =

Australian molecular biologist

- Education: University of Oxford, Magdalen College
- Occupation: Molecular biologist
- Awards: Edgeworth David Medal (1999); Gottschalk Medal (2002); Member of the Order of Australia (For significant service to education, and to molecular biology., Professor Paul Merlin CROSSLEY, 2023); Lemberg Medal (2021); Rhodes Scholarship (1987)
- Scientific career
- Workplaces: University of New South Wales (2010–2016); University of Sydney (1995–2009); Harvard University (1991–1995); University of Oxford (1990–1991); University of Melbourne (1986–1987)

Merlin Crossley, AM is an Australian molecular biologist, university teacher, and administrator. He is Deputy Vice-Chancellor for Academic Quality at the University of New South Wales.

== Early life and career ==
Crossley attended Mount View Primary School, Glen Waverley, Victoria, then was awarded an entrance scholarship to Melbourne Grammar School, where he was dux. He undertook a Bachelor of Science at the University of Melbourne, as a resident of Queen's College (University of Melbourne), then a doctorate at the University of Oxford supported by a Rhodes Scholarship at Magdalen College, Oxford. He worked at Oxford, Harvard and the University of Sydney, before moving to UNSW as Dean of Science. In recognition of his service on the Trust of the Australian Museum a new species of butterfly bobtail squid was named in his honour - Iridoteuthis merlini - Merlin's bobtail squid.

== University leadership ==
Crossley has held senior roles at both the University of Sydney and the University of New South Wales. He has led the research portfolio and the teaching portfolio. He is most well known for overseeing the introduction in 2019 of a 3-term year at UNSW, https://www.inside.unsw.edu.au/2025-strategy/are-you-unsw3-ready, necessitating the reintroduction of a 2-semester year from 2028.

== Research ==
Crossley is interested in gene regulation. He studied an unusual genetic disorder termed Haemophilia B Leyden where patients recover after puberty. The condition results from mutations that disrupt the control region of the clotting factor IX gene. A testosterone-responsive element accounts for post-pubertal recovery.

He has also investigated abnormal patterns of globin gene expression and his work on mutations associated with the lifelong expression of the fetal haemoglobin gene may help in the treatment of thalassemia and sickle cell anaemia. He is using CRISPR-mediated gene editing to introduce beneficial mutations in cell lines as models for treating genetic diseases. Clinical trials by major gene editing companies are now introducing mutations that his lab described.

This recent work is considered highly significant. Because co-inheriting mutations that generate lifelong fetal globin expression (so-called Hereditary Persistence of Fetal Hemoglobin or HPFH mutations) essentially prevents Sickle Cell Disease and beta-thalassemia, understanding the molecular mechanisms and mimicking them by CRISPR-gene editing has become the major therapeutic strategy.

Crossley’s lab made three seminal contributions: he showed all the natural point mutations in the fetal globin gene promoter that cause HPFH either create new sites for gene activating proteins or disrupt sites for repressors, BCL11A or ZBTB7A. This is how he discovered ZBTB7A was one of the two major fetal globin repressors, and is how BCL11A was found to directly repress the fetal globin gene. He also showed how deletions in the beta-globin locus alleviate fetal globin silencing. There are many different deletions but they all remove the beta-globin gene promoter. This means that the fetal globin promoter no longer has competition from the beta-globin promoter and it can now access the large enhancer, the Locus Control Region. Finally, he showed that methylation, not only correlates with fetal globin silencing but that removing or adding back DNA methylation (using deadCas9-mediated epigenetic editing) can turn the gene on and off. This is significant as epigenetic editing does not cut the DNA so may be even safer than standard CRISPR-editing and base editing.

He is also known for the initial identification and cloning of a significant number of genes encoding DNA-binding proteins: KLF3, KLF8, KLF17, EOS IKZF4, PEGASUS IKZF5, and their associated co-regulators: FOG1 ZFPM1, FOG2 ZFPM2, and CTBP2. These genes encode gene regulatory proteins (also known as transcription factors) and their co-regulators that turn genes on and off. Identifying the proteins involved was an important foundational step in our understanding of how the genome is regulated.

Several additional discoveries are of note: in the early 2000s, his lab noted that several gene regulatory proteins that turn genes off contained SUMOylation motifs within their repression domains. In 2023 a comprehensive study of the 2000 gene regulatory proteins in humans in Nature concluded that indeed repression domains do typically have SUMOylation sites, thus linking SUMOylation with gene repression. The second discovery involves zinc fingers, small protein domains usually known for DNA-binding. His lab was involved in showing that zinc fingers can also mediate protein-protein interactions, best characterized by the interaction between the blood gene regulatory proteins, GATA1 and Friend of GATA. He has been the advisor to the Human Genome Nomenclature Committee on the naming of the Kruppel-like Factor family and as well as identifying and cloning the genes for KLF3, KLF8, and KLF17, he discovered the cross-regulation between KLF1, KLF3, and KLF8, illustrating both redundancy and inter-dependency within this gene family.

== Other activities ==
He has contributed numerous articles on molecular genetics and education to newspapers and media outlets such as The Conversation (website) and has promoted science communication, for instance as a member of the judging panel for the annual anthology, Best Australian Science Writing. He is Deputy Director of the Australian Science Media Centre (AusSMC), has served on the Trust of the Australian Museum 2012-20 and the Board of the Sydney Institute of Marine Science 2010-15, and is on the Board of, and Chair of the Editorial Board of The Conversation (website).

== Honours and awards ==
- Member (AM) in the General Division of the Order of Australia - 2023
- Award for Research Excellence, Federation of Asian and Oceanian Biochemists and Molecular Biologists - 2023
- Lemberg Medal, Australian Society of Biochemistry and Molecular Biology – 2021
- NSW Premier's Prize for Excellence in Medical Biological Sciences - 2020
- Fellow of the Royal Society of New South Wales - 2014
- Fellow of Queen's College (University of Melbourne) - 2013
- Julian Wells Medal, Lorne Genome Conference - 2010
- Australian Academy of Science Gottschalk Medal - 2002
- Royal Society of New South Wales Sir Edgeworth David Medal - 2000
- Australian Society for Biochemistry and Molecular Biology Roche Medal - 1999
- Rhodes Scholarship 1987 -1990
