= Kruppel-like factors =

Family of zinc finger transcription factors

In molecular genetics, the Krüppel-like family of transcription factors (KLFs) are a set of eukaryotic Cys_{2}His_{2} zinc finger DNA-binding proteins that regulate gene expression. This family has been expanded to also include the Sp transcription factor and related proteins, forming the Sp/KLF family.

== Members ==
The following human genes encode Kruppel-like factors: KLF1, KLF2, KLF3, KLF4, KLF5, KLF6, KLF7, KLF8, KLF9, KLF10, KLF11, KLF12, KLF13, KLF14, KLF15, KLF16, KLF17

The following genes are Sp factors: Sp1, Sp2, Sp3, Sp4, Sp5, Sp6, Sp7, Sp8, and Sp9.

Note that although KLF14 was an alias for Sp6 (Q3SY56), it now refers to a protein (Q8TD94) derived from KLF16 by a retrotransposon event.

== Function and properties ==
Phylogenetic tree of the 17 human KLF proteins. Based on their functional domains and other features they are divided into three distinct groups. The scale is a unit of 100 amino acids (aa). Modified after McConnell and Yang 2010.

KLF/Sps are a family of transcription factors that contain three carboxyl-terminal (C-terminal) Cys_{2}His_{2}-type zinc finger structural motifs that bind to the GC-rich regions in DNA and regulate various cellular functions, such as proliferation, differentiation, and apoptosis, as well as the development and homeostasis of several types of tissue. The C-terminal end binds to the promoter and enhancer regions of a gene. Each KLF also has a unique amino-terminal (N-terminal) end that acts as the functional domain that allows it to bind specifically to a certain partner. KLFs share the similar function of transcription regulation via the recruitment of regulatory proteins. These transcription factors have a conserved structural homology between mammalian species, which allow for similar function due to similar protein interaction motifs at the N-terminal domains. The C-terminal end is also highly conserved with both the first and second zinc finger have 25 amino acids, while the third has 23 amino acids. Each of the three zinc fingers recognize three unique base pairs for their DNA-binding sites, which together make the general form NCR CRC CCN (where N is any base and R is a purine). There is some evidence that positively-charged amino acids within the three zinc fingers may contribute towards localizing the protein in the Nucleus. The N-terminal end allows for the binding of various coactivators, corepressors, and modifiers. All family members share the zinc finger signature KLF-DBD of CxxxxCxxxxxxxxxxxxHxxxHxxxxxxxCxxxxCxxxxxxxxxxxxHxxxHxxxxxxxCxxCxxxxxxxxxxxxHxxxH and use a 9aaTAD.

KLFs are divided into three subgroups; Group 1 (KLF 3,8, and 12) are repressors via interaction with the C-terminal Binding Protein 1 and 2 (CtBP1 and CtBP2). Group 2 (KLFs 1,2,4,5,6, and 7) are transcription activators. Group 3 (KLFs 9,10,11,13,12, and 16) have repressor activity via interaction with the common transcriptional co-repressor, Sin3A. KLFs 15 and 17 are distantly related without any defined protein interaction motifs.

The Sp family members diverged from KLFs since Filozoa. They are typically divided into two groups of Sp1-4 and Sp5-9. One of the signatures is the "Btd box" CxCPxC preceding the KLF-DBD.

== Evolutionary and biochemical mechanisms ==
The proliferation of KLF genes, presumably from an ancestral KLF, is also interesting. In some cases different family members are expressed in different tissues. The first KLF, KLF1, originally known as Erythroid KLF (EKLF) is expressed only in red blood cells and megakaryocytes. It drives red blood cell differentiation and represses megakaryocyte formation. It appears that it has arisen as a KLF family member that has a particular role in these two blood lineages. Other KLFs are more broadly expressed and there are interactions between family members. KLF3 for instance is driven by KLF1 as is KLF8. On the other hand, KLF3 represses KLF8. Such cross-regulation occurs extensively in transcription factor families. Many transcription factor genes regulate their own promoters and when a gene duplicates during evolution then cross-regulation often occurs. The cross-regulation can ensure that the total amount of KLFs in the cell is monitored and controlled.

Finally, the biological roles of the KLFs are of wide interest. KLF1 is a very important factor in red blood cell biology. Naturally occurring human mutations in the KLF1 gene have been associated with de-repression of the fetal globin gene. KLF2 (originally Lung KLF ) also has a role in embryonic globin gene expression, as does KLF3 (originally Basic KLF). KLF3 also has roles in adipocyte or fat formation, and in B lymphocytes. Recently, KLF3 was shown to be important in heart development. KLF4 (originally Gut KLF) is an important gene in the gut and skin but has more recently risen to prominence as one of the four genes that can reprogram body cells to become stem cells. [KLF4] is one of the so-called magic four transcription factors, KLF4, Oct4, SOX2 and MYC. KLF5, like KLF3, is important in adipocytes and KLF6 is an important tumour suppressor gene, that is often mutated in prostate cancers.

== Krüppel-like factor 3 ==
KLF3 has a short motif in the N-terminus (of the form Proline-Isoleucine-Aspartate-Leucine-Serine or PIDLS) that recruits CtBP1 and 2. CtBP in turn recruits histone modifying enzymes. It brings in histone deacetylases, histone demethylases and histone methylases, which are thought to remove active chromatin marks and lay down repressive marks to eliminate gene expression.

== Krüppel-like factors 4 and 5 ==
Klf4, also known as gut-enriched Krüppel-like factor (GKLF), acts as a transcriptional activator or repressor depending on the promoter context and/or cooperation with other transcription factors. For example, Klf4 transactivates the iNOS promoter in cooperation with p65 (RelA), and the p21Cip1/Waf1 promoter in cooperation with p53, but it directly suppresses the p53 promoter and inhibits ornithine decarboxylase (ODC) promoter activity by competing with specificity protein-1 (Sp-1). Klf4 also interacts with the p300/CBP transcription co-activators. Klf5, also known as intestinal enriched Krüppel-like factor (IKLF) or basic transcription element binding protein 2 (Bteb2), has been assigned purely transcriptional activation activity but, similar to Klf4, binds p300 which acetylates the first zinc finger conferring a trans-activating function. Importantly for Klf4 and Klf5, the amino acids that are predicted to interact with DNA are identical and the two compete for the same CACCC element or GC-rich sequence of the gene promoter region to regulate cell proliferation or differentiation-elated gene expression. Klf4 and Klf5 can act antagonistically during cellular proliferation, differentiation, and promoter activation, either via direct competition or via alterations in their own gene expression. The expression of Klf4 in terminally differentiated, post-mitotic intestinal epithelial cells as opposed to proliferating crypt cells which contain high levels of Klf5 is one example of such opposing effects. Klf4 inhibits proliferation through activation of p21Cip1/Waf1, and direct suppression of cyclin D1 and cyclin B1 gene expression. Both Klf4 & Klf5 proteins act on the Klf4 promoter where Klf4 increases expression and Klf5 decreases expression of Klf4 mRNA. The Wnt/APC signal pathway also plays an important role in the regulation of KLF4 expression. LOH, point mutations in the coding region and promoter hypermethylation are the main causes of klf4 gene silencing.

=== In the vascular system ===
Klf4 is upregulated in vascular injury. It dramatically represses SRF/myocardin-induced activation of gene expression, and directly inhibits myocardin gene expression in vascular smooth muscle cells (VSMCs), therefore inhibiting the transition to a proliferative phenotype . Furthermore, Klf4 has been identified as an anti-proliferative shear stress-responsive gene, and forced over-expression of Klf4 in VSMCs induces growth arrest. Klf4 may therefore be an important protective factor in disease states affected by shear stress, such as thrombosis, restenosis and atherosclerosis. Klf4 also mediates the vascular response to nitric oxide (NO) by activating the promoters of inducible nitric oxide synthase (iNOS) in endothelial cells and cGMP-dependent protein kinase 1α/protein kinase G 1α (PKG 1α) in VSMCs. PKG 1α is activated by NO and mediates VSMC relaxation. This trans-activating effect of Klf4 on the PKG 1α promoter is inhibited by RhoA-induced actin polymerisation, possibly via G-actin regulation of a Klf4 co-activator or co-repressor. RhoA signalling pathways and RhoA activation are implicated in hypertension and increased vascular resistance which to some extent can be explained by this interaction with Klf4 and its effects on the response to NO. Klf5 has no effect on the PKG 1α promoter though the protein expression and nuclear localisation of Klf5 was similar to that of Klf4.

KLF-2 activation has been associated with laminar blood flow, a key protective force in the arterial walls that helps prevent atherosclerosis since it induces a protective phenotype in endothelial cells. In low-shear stress regions, KLF-2 inhibits a mechanosensory complex composed of platelet endothelial cell adhesion molecule (PECAM-1), vascular endothelial cadherin (VE-cadherin), and vascular endothelial growth factor receptor 2/3 (VEGFR2/3).

=== In the myocardium ===
Little is known of the Klfs in the myocardium. Klf5 activates the promoter of the hypertrophic agonist platelet derived growth factor (PDGFA) in cardiac fibroblasts a factor previously identified as being upregulated by ET-1, and Klf5+/- transgenic mice heterozygotes (described earlier) exhibited less cardiac fibrosis and hypertrophy when stimulated with angiotensin II compared with controls. Klf5 is itself regulated by the immediate early gene egr-1 in VSMCs, which, if similarly regulated in the cardiomyocyte, places Klf5 potentially in a position to co-ordinate the acute response to external stress and tissue remodelling in the myocardium.

== In genomic engineering ==
The understanding of the structure and function of KLFs has informed the design of artificial transcription factors. Artificial zinc fingers can be built to recognize chosen sites in DNA and artificial functional domains can be added to either activate or repress genes containing these sites.
