= KLF3 =

Protein-coding gene in the species Homo sapiens

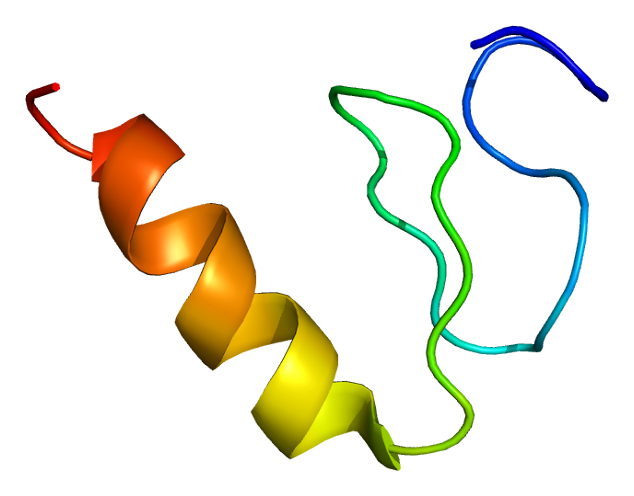

Identifiers
- Aliases: KLF3, BKLF, Kruppel-like factor 3 (basic), Kruppel like factor 3
- External IDs: OMIM: 609392; MGI: 1342773; GeneCards: KLF3
Available structures
PDB	Ortholog search: PDBe RCSB
PDB	List of PDB id codes 1P7A, 1U85, 1U86

Gene location (Human)
Chr.	Chromosome 4 (human)
Band	4p14	Start	38,664,197 bp
Band	4p14	End	38,701,517 bp

Gene location (Mouse)
Chr.	Chromosome 5 (mouse)
Band	5|5 C3.1	Start	64,960,731 bp
Band	5|5 C3.1	End	64,990,244 bp
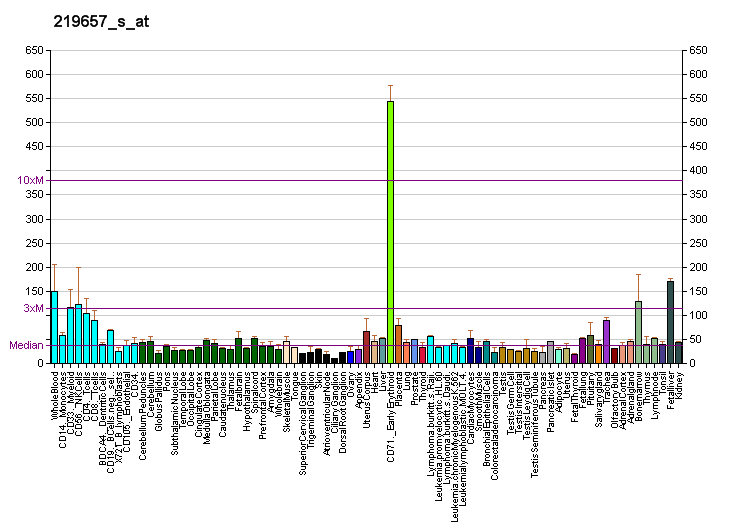
RNA expression pattern
Bgee	Human / Mouse (ortholog); Top expressed in: skin of thigh; human penis; mucosa of paranasal sinus; jejunal mucosa; mucosa of sigmoid colon; trabecular bone; mucosa of pharynx; oral cavity; gums; vulva / Top expressed in: left colon; epithelium of stomach; skin of external ear; genital tubercle; conjunctival fornix; Paneth cell; left lung lobe; blood; gastrula; mesenteric lymph nodes; More reference expression data
BioGPS	More reference expression data
Gene ontology
Molecular function	DNA-binding transcription factor activity; DNA binding; protein binding; metal ion binding; nucleic acid binding; RNA polymerase II transcription regulatory region sequence-specific DNA binding; DNA-binding transcription factor activity, RNA polymerase II-specific
Cellular component	nucleus; nucleoplasm
Biological process	multicellular organism development; cellular response to peptide; regulation of transcription, DNA-templated; transcription, DNA-templated; negative regulation of transcription by RNA polymerase II; regulation of transcription by RNA polymerase II
Sources:Amigo / QuickGO
Orthologs
Databases	NCBI: entry; OMA: entry
Species	Human	Mouse
Entrez	51274	16599
Ensembl	ENSG00000109787	ENSMUSG00000029178
UniProt	P57682	Q60980
RefSeq (mRNA)	NM_016531	NM_008453
RefSeq (protein)	NP_057615	NP_032479
Location (UCSC)	Chr 4: 38.66 – 38.7 Mb	Chr 5: 64.96 – 64.99 Mb
PubMed search
- Wikidata
View/Edit Human	View/Edit Mouse

Krüppel-like factor 3 is a protein that in humans is encoded by the KLF3 gene.

== Structure ==
KLF3, originally termed Basic Krüppel-like Factor (BKLF), was the third member of the Krüppel-like factor family of zinc finger transcription factors to be discovered. Transcription factors in this family bind DNA by virtue of 3 characteristic three C_{2}H_{2} zinc fingers at their C-termini. Since their DNA-binding domains are highly conserved within the family, all KLF proteins recognize CACCC or CGCCC boxes of the general form NCR CRC CCN, (where N is any base and R is a purine).

== Function ==
While the C-termini are similar in different KLFs, the N-termini vary and accordingly different KLFs can either activate or repress transcription or both. KLF3 appears to function predominantly as a repressor of transcription. It turns genes off. It does this by recruiting the C-terminal Binding Protein co-repressors CTBP1 and CTBP2. CtBP docks onto a short motif (residues 61-65) in the N-terminus of KLF3, of the general form Proline – Isoleucine – Aspartate – Leucine – Serine (the PIDLS motif). CtBP in turn recruits histone modifying enzymes to alter chromatin and repress gene expression.

KLF3 is expressed highly in the red blood cell or erythroid lineage. Here it is driven by another KLF, Erythroid KLF or KLF1, and its expression increases as erythroid cells mature. Studies in knockout mice reveal a mild anemia in the absence of functional KLF3 and the de-repression of several target genes that contain CACCC boxes in their regulatory regions. Many of these genes are activated by KLF1, hence it appears that KLF3 operates in a negative feedback loop to balance the activating potential of KLF1. KLF3 also regulates another repressive KLF, KLF8. Thus KLF1, KLF3 and KLF8 operate in a tight regulatory network. KLF3 and KLF8 may have redundant functions, as mice lacking both KLF3 and KLF8 show defects that are more severe than in either single knockout. They die in utero around day 14 of gestation.

As well as being expressed in erythroid cells, KLF3 is present in other cell types and analysis of the knockout mice has revealed defects affecting adipose tissue and B cells. KLF3 deficient mice have less adipose tissue and indications of metabolic health that may be attributable to de-repression of the adipokine hormone gene adipolin. The role of KLF3 in B lymphocytes is complex but it appears to operate in a network with KLF2 and KLF4 to influence the switch between spleen marginal zone and follicular B cells.

== Interactions ==
KLF3 has been shown to interact with:

- CTBP2 and
- FHL3.
