= CTBP1 =

Protein-coding gene in the species Homo sapiens

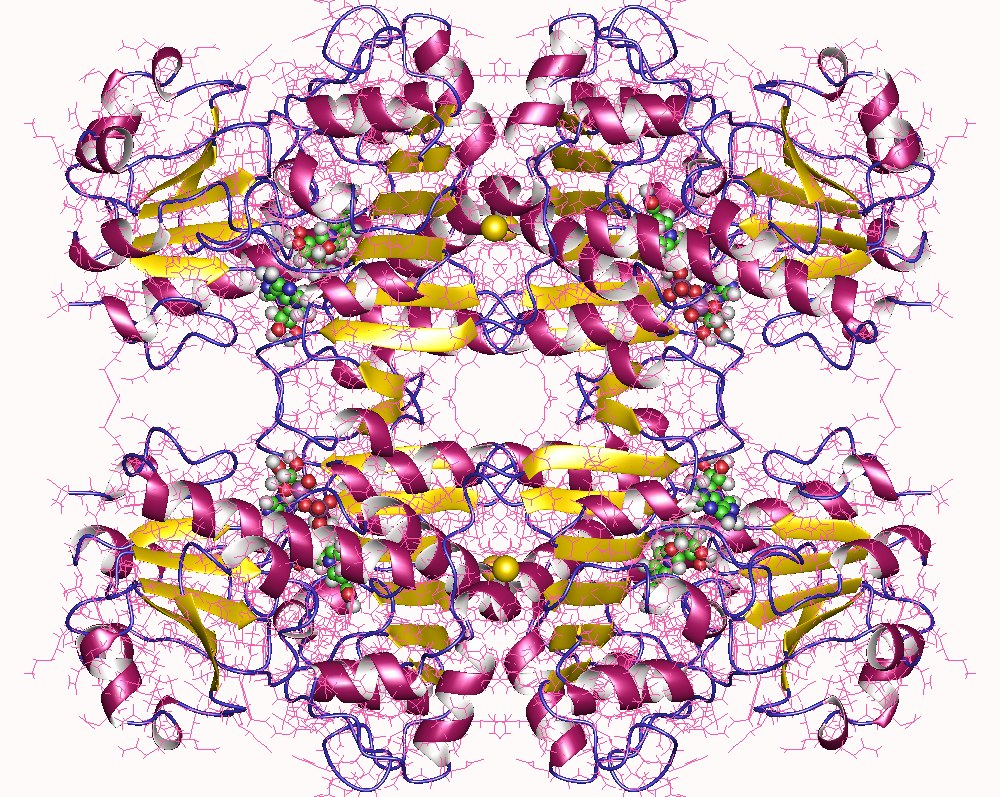
Available structures
PDB	Ortholog search: PDBe RCSB
PDB	List of PDB id codes 1MX3, 4LCE, 4U6Q

Identifiers
- Aliases: CTBP1, C-terminal binding protein 1, BARS, HADDTS
- External IDs: OMIM: 602618; MGI: 1201685; HomoloGene: 1015; GeneCards: CTBP1; OMA:CTBP1 - orthologs

Gene location (Human)
Chr.	Chromosome 4 (human)
Band	4p16.3	Start	1,211,445 bp
Band	4p16.3	End	1,249,953 bp

Gene location (Mouse)
Chr.	Chromosome 5 (mouse)
Band	5 B1|5 17.52 cM	Start	33,405,067 bp
Band	5 B1|5 17.52 cM	End	33,432,338 bp
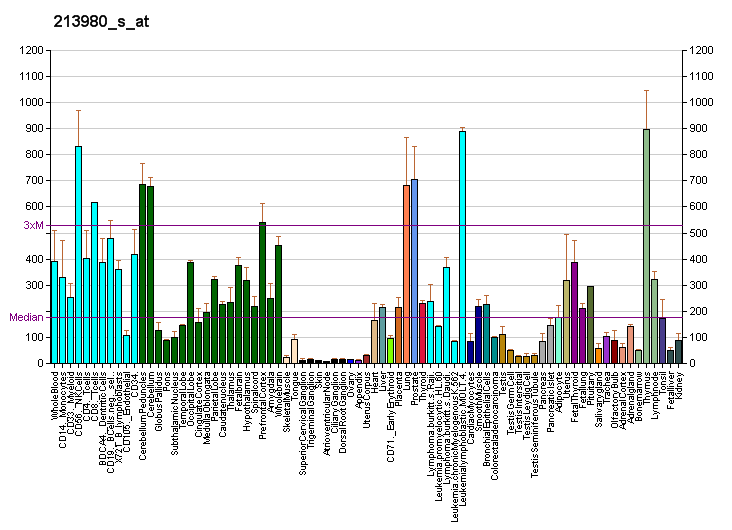

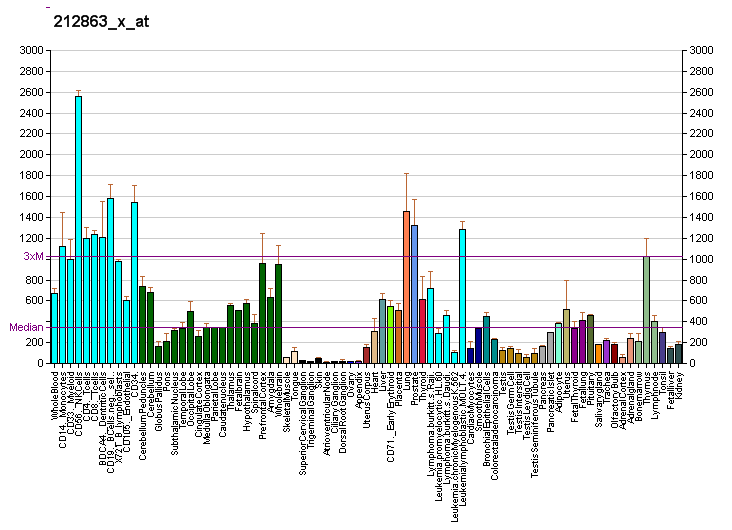

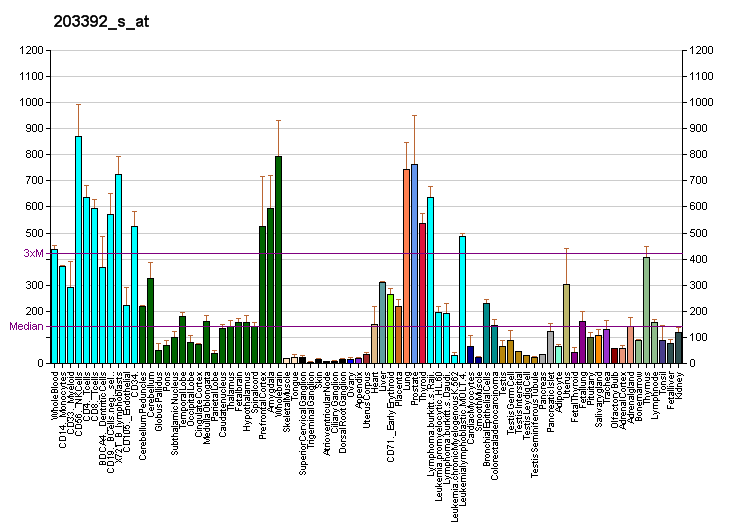
RNA expression pattern
Bgee	Human / Mouse (ortholog); Top expressed in: tendon of biceps brachii; right hemisphere of cerebellum; internal globus pallidus; anterior pituitary; postcentral gyrus; buccal mucosa cell; body of pancreas; Region I of hippocampus proper; stromal cell of endometrium; prefrontal cortex / Top expressed in: renal corpuscle; medullary collecting duct; ventricular zone; tail of embryo; fetal liver hematopoietic progenitor cell; ganglionic eminence; Rostral migratory stream; Paneth cell; dentate gyrus of hippocampal formation granule cell; medial ganglionic eminence; More reference expression data
BioGPS	More reference expression data
Gene ontology
Molecular function	oxidoreductase activity, acting on the CH-OH group of donors, NAD or NADP as acceptor; transcription corepressor activity; protein domain specific binding; DNA-binding transcription factor activity; NAD binding; transcription factor binding; protein C-terminus binding; protein binding; oxidoreductase activity; identical protein binding; hydroxypyruvate reductase activity; glyoxylate reductase (NADP+) activity; protein homodimerization activity
Cellular component	cytoplasm; transcription regulator complex; transcription repressor complex; nucleoplasm; nucleus; cytosol; presynaptic active zone cytoplasmic component; glutamatergic synapse; GABA-ergic synapse
Biological process	positive regulation of histone deacetylation; cell differentiation; regulation of transcription, DNA-templated; viral genome replication; negative regulation of transcription by RNA polymerase II; transcription, DNA-templated; regulation of cell cycle; negative regulation of histone H4 acetylation; protein phosphorylation; white fat cell differentiation; metabolism; viral process; negative regulation of transcription, DNA-templated; negative regulation of histone acetylation; negative regulation of cell population proliferation
Sources:Amigo / QuickGO
Orthologs
Species	Human	Mouse
Entrez	1487	13016
Ensembl	ENSG00000159692	ENSMUSG00000037373
UniProt	Q13363	O88712
RefSeq (mRNA)	NM_001012614; NM_001328; NM_001377186; NM_001377187; NM_001377188 NM_001377189; NM_001377190; NM_001377191; NM_001377192; NM_001377193	NM_001198859; NM_001198860; NM_001198861; NM_013502; NM_001310535
RefSeq (protein)	NP_001012632; NP_001319; NP_001364115; NP_001364116; NP_001364117 NP_001364118; NP_001364119; NP_001364120; NP_001364121; NP_001364122	NP_001185788; NP_001185789; NP_001185790; NP_001297464; NP_038530
Location (UCSC)	Chr 4: 1.21 – 1.25 Mb	Chr 5: 33.41 – 33.43 Mb
PubMed search
- Wikidata
View/Edit Human	View/Edit Mouse

C-terminal-binding protein 1 also known as CtBP1 is a protein that in humans is encoded by the CTBP1 gene. CtBP1 is one of two CtBP proteins, the other protein being CtBP2.

== Function ==
The CtBP1 protein was originally identified as a human protein that bound a PLDLS motif in the C-terminus of adenovirus E1A proteins. It and the related protein CTBP2 were later shown to function as transcriptional corepressors. That is, regulatory proteins that bind to sequence-specific DNA-binding proteins and help turn genes off. CtBPs do this by recruiting histone modifying enzymes that add repressive histone marks and remove activating marks. CtBP proteins can also self-associate and presumably bring together gene regulatory complexes.

CtBP1 is broadly expressed from embryo to adult, while CtBP2 has a somewhat more restricted pattern of expression. CtBPs have multiple biological roles and appear to be most important in regulating the epithelial to mesenchymal transition, as well as influencing metabolism. They do the latter by binding NADH in preference to NAD+, thereby sensing the NADH/NAD+ ratio. When bound, it undergoes a conformational change that allows it to dimerize and associate with its partner proteins and silence specific genes.

During skeletal and T cell development, CtBP1 and CtBP2 associate with the PLDLSL domain of δEF1, a cellular zinc finger-homeodomain protein, and thereby enhances δEF1-induced transcriptional silencing. CtBP also binds the Kruppel-like factors family of zinc finger proteins KLF3, KLF8 and KLF12. In addition, CtBP complexes with CtIP, a 125 kDa protein that recognizes distinctly different protein motifs from CtBP. CtIP binds to the BRCT repeats within the breast cancer gene BRCA1 and enables CtBP to influence BRCA1 activity. Both proteins can also interact with a polycomb group protein complex which participates in regulation of gene expression during development. Alternative splicing of transcripts from this gene results in multiple transcript variants.

C-terminal-binding protein interacting protein (CtIP) is a binding partner with CtBP, which contribute to transcription repression and cell cycle regulation, and which have a role in the cellular response to DNA damage.

== Interactions ==
CTBP1 has been shown to interact with:

- ACTL6B,
- ARF,
- EVI1
- FOXP2,
- HDAC1,
- IKZF1,
- IKZF4,
- KLF3,
- KLF8,
- Mdm2,
- MLL,
- NRIP1,
- Pinin,
- RBBP8, and
- TGIF1.
- GATA1.
