= Zinc finger protein 180 =

Protein found in humans

ZNF180

Identifiers
- Aliases: ZNF180, HHZ168, zinc finger protein 180
- External IDs: OMIM: 606740; MGI: 1923701; GeneCards: ZNF180

Gene location (Human)
Chr.	Chromosome 19 (human)
Band	19q13.31	Start	44,474,428 bp
Band	19q13.31	End	44,500,524 bp

Gene location (Mouse)
Chr.	Chromosome 7 (mouse)
Band	7|7 A3	Start	23,781,349 bp
Band	7|7 A3	End	23,807,138 bp
RNA expression pattern
Bgee	Human / Mouse (ortholog); Top expressed in: endothelial cell; testicle; gonad; Achilles tendon; ganglionic eminence; ventricular zone; granulocyte; islet of Langerhans; sural nerve; parietal pleura / Top expressed in: hand; olfactory tubercle; superior cervical ganglion; primary motor cortex; Region I of hippocampus proper; Rostral migratory stream; lobe of cerebellum; superior frontal gyrus; nucleus accumbens; cingulate gyrus; More reference expression data
BioGPS	n/a
Gene ontology
Molecular function	DNA binding; protein binding; metal ion binding; nucleic acid binding; DNA-binding transcription factor activity, RNA polymerase II-specific
Cellular component	intracellular anatomical structure; nucleus
Biological process	regulation of transcription, DNA-templated; transcription, DNA-templated; regulation of transcription by RNA polymerase II
Sources:Amigo / QuickGO
Orthologs
Databases	NCBI: entry; OMA: entry
Species	Human	Mouse
Entrez	7733	210135
Ensembl	ENSG00000167384	ENSMUSG00000057101
UniProt	Q9UJW8	n/a
RefSeq (mRNA)	NM_001278508; NM_001278509; NM_001288759; NM_001288760; NM_001288761 NM_001288762; NM_001291633; NM_013256	NM_001045486; NM_001289634; NM_001289637; NM_001289640; NM_001289641 NM_172483
RefSeq (protein)	NP_001265437; NP_001265438; NP_001275688; NP_001275689; NP_001275690 NP_001275691; NP_001278562; NP_037388	n/a
Location (UCSC)	Chr 19: 44.47 – 44.5 Mb	Chr 7: 23.78 – 23.81 Mb
PubMed search
- Wikidata
View/Edit Human	View/Edit Mouse

Zinc finger protein 180 is a protein that is encoded in humans by the ZNF180 gene.

== Function ==
Zinc finger proteins have been shown to interact with nucleic acids and to have diverse functions. The zinc finger domain is a conserved amino acid sequence motif containing two specifically positioned cysteines and two histidines that are involved in coordinating zinc. Kruppel-related proteins form one family of zinc finger proteins. See MIM 604749 for additional information on zinc finger proteins.
