= NRIP1 =

Protein-coding gene in the species Homo sapiens

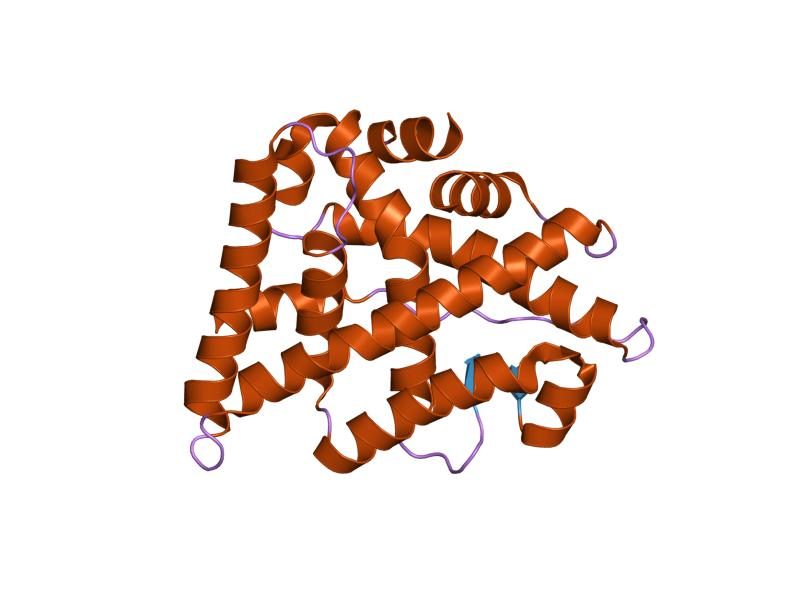

Identifiers
- Aliases: NRIP1, RIP140, nuclear receptor interacting protein 1, CAKUT3
- External IDs: OMIM: 602490; MGI: 1315213; GeneCards: NRIP1
Available structures
PDB	Ortholog search: PDBe RCSB
PDB	List of PDB id codes 2GPO, 2GPP, 4S14, 4S15

Gene location (Human)
Chr.	Chromosome 21 (human)
Band	21q11.2-q21.1	Start	14,961,235 bp
Band	21q11.2-q21.1	End	15,065,936 bp

Gene location (Mouse)
Chr.	Chromosome 16 (mouse)
Band	16|16 C3.1	Start	76,084,288 bp
Band	16|16 C3.1	End	76,170,715 bp
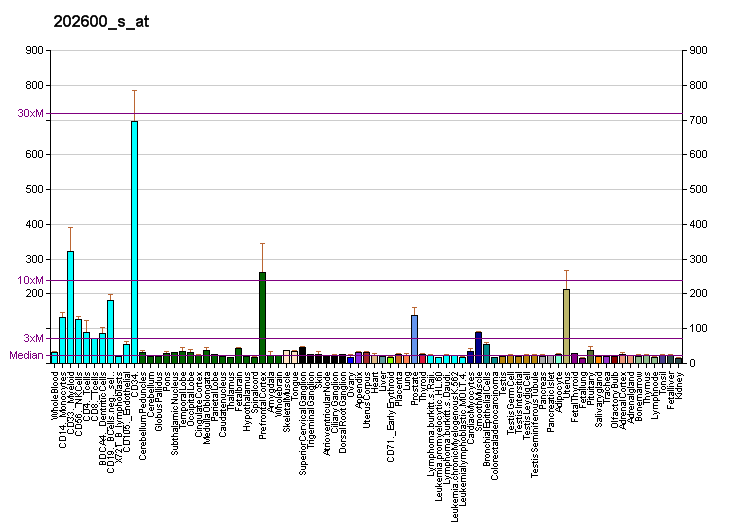
RNA expression pattern
Bgee	Human / Mouse (ortholog); Top expressed in: corpus epididymis; caput epididymis; jejunal mucosa; retinal pigment epithelium; tail of epididymis; lactiferous duct; trabecular bone; Skeletal muscle tissue of biceps brachii; superficial temporal artery; human penis / Top expressed in: lacrimal gland; medullary collecting duct; left colon; lobe of prostate; human fetus; seminal vesicula; renal corpuscle; parotid gland; subcutaneous adipose tissue; ankle; More reference expression data
BioGPS	More reference expression data
Gene ontology
Molecular function	glucocorticoid receptor binding; signaling receptor binding; transcription coregulator activity; retinoid X receptor binding; histone deacetylase binding; androgen receptor binding; core promoter sequence-specific DNA binding; retinoic acid receptor binding; protein binding; transcription corepressor activity; transcription coactivator activity; estrogen receptor binding; RNA polymerase II cis-regulatory region sequence-specific DNA binding
Cellular component	nucleolus; histone deacetylase complex; nuclear speck; nucleus; nucleoplasm
Biological process	rhythmic process; transcription, DNA-templated; ovulation; regulation of transcription by RNA polymerase II; lipid storage; androgen receptor signaling pathway; positive regulation of transcription, DNA-templated; cellular response to estradiol stimulus; regulation of transcription, DNA-templated; positive regulation of transcription by RNA polymerase II; ovarian follicle rupture; circadian regulation of gene expression; negative regulation of transcription by RNA polymerase II; circadian rhythm
Sources:Amigo / QuickGO
Orthologs
Databases	NCBI: entry; OMA: entry
Species	Human	Mouse
Entrez	8204	268903
Ensembl	ENSG00000180530	ENSMUSG00000048490
UniProt	P48552	Q8CBD1
RefSeq (mRNA)	NM_003489	NM_173440; NM_001358238
RefSeq (protein)	NP_003480	NP_775616; NP_001345167
Location (UCSC)	Chr 21: 14.96 – 15.07 Mb	Chr 16: 76.08 – 76.17 Mb
PubMed search
- Wikidata
View/Edit Human	View/Edit Mouse

Nuclear receptor-interacting protein 1 repression 1

Identifiers
- Symbol: NRIP1_repr_1
- Pfam: PF15687
Available protein structures:
- PDB: PF15687 (ECOD; PDBsum)
- AlphaFold: PF15687

Nuclear receptor-interacting protein 1 repression 2

Identifiers
- Symbol: NRIP1_repr_2
- Pfam: PF15688
Available protein structures:
- PDB: PF15688 (ECOD; PDBsum)
- AlphaFold: PF15688

Nuclear receptor-interacting protein 1 repression 3

Identifiers
- Symbol: NRIP1_repr_3
- Pfam: PF15689
Available protein structures:
- PDB: PF15689 (ECOD; PDBsum)
- AlphaFold: PF15689

Nuclear receptor-interacting protein 1 repression 4

Identifiers
- Symbol: NRIP1_repr_4
- Pfam: PF15690
Available protein structures:
- PDB: PF15690 (ECOD; PDBsum)
- AlphaFold: PF15690

Nuclear receptor-interacting protein 1 (NRIP1), also known as receptor-interacting protein 140 (RIP140), is a protein that in humans is encoded by the NRIP1 gene. It is a large transcription coregulator that functions primarily as a corepressor for a wide array of nuclear receptors and other transcription factors, thereby silencing the expression of target genes. Because it sits at the hub of multiple signaling pathways, NRIP1 profoundly influences metabolism, reproduction, inflammation, cancer, and circadian rhythms. The protein is modular, containing several distinct repression domains and multiple receptor-interaction motifs. Its activity is tightly controlled by post-translational modifications, subcellular localization, and tissue‑specific expression. Mice lacking the gene are lean, resistant to obesity, and have impaired ovulation, while elevated levels are associated with cachexia and certain cancers.

== Gene location and structure ==
The human NRIP1 gene is located on the long arm of chromosome 21 at band 21q21.1. It is situated in a relatively gene‑poor region. The gene spans approximately 84,000 base pairs and consists of 19 coding exons. The genomic organization is conserved across mammals. Upstream promoter elements contain binding sites for transcription factors such as estrogen‑related receptor alpha (ERRα), specificity protein 1 (Sp1), and the glucocorticoid receptor, allowing integration of hormonal and metabolic signals.

The primary mRNA transcript is about 5.3 kilobases and gives rise to a single major protein isoform of 1,158 amino acids. No functional alternative splice variants have been thoroughly characterized in humans, although minor transcripts of uncertain significance have been reported. The gene is transcribed in virtually all tissues, but expression levels are highest in white adipose tissue, skeletal muscle, liver, heart, and ovary. In fat and muscle, NRIP1 acts as a metabolic brake; in the ovary it is essential for ovulation.

== Protein structure and domain organization ==
The NRIP1 protein has a predicted molecular mass of approximately 132 kDa. It contains several discrete functional domains that mediate its interactions with nuclear receptors, corepressor complexes, and chromatin‑modifying enzymes.

=== Receptor interaction motifs ===
NRIP1 binds to nuclear receptors mainly through four LXXLL motifs (also called NR boxes) located in the central and C‑terminal parts of the protein. The LXXLL motif forms an amphipathic α‑helix that docks into the hydrophobic cleft of the receptor’s ligand‑binding domain (LBD) in a ligand‑dependent fashion. Additionally, an N‑terminal receptor‑interacting domain (RID) can also contact nuclear receptors using sequences distinct from LXXLL, which broadens the spectrum of partners and may permit ligand‑independent binding.

=== Repression domains ===
NRIP1 possesses four independent repression domains designated RD1 through RD4. Each can autonomously silence transcription when tethered to DNA. The Pfam database classifies these domains as four separate families: NRIP1_repr_1, NRIP1_repr_2, NRIP1_repr_3, and NRIP1_repr_4. The repression domains are enriched in proline, glutamic acid, serine, and threonine (PEST sequences) and serve as platforms for the assembly of multi‑protein repression complexes. RD1 and RD2 are located in the central region; RD3 and RD4 reside near the C‑terminus. They function cooperatively, and deletion of any one domain reduces but does not abolish overall repressive activity.

=== CtBP‑binding motifs ===
Several CtBP‑binding motifs of the form PLDLS or related sequences are scattered through the protein. These motifs mediate the recruitment of the C‑terminal binding proteins CTBP1 and CTBP2. CtBP recruitment is enhanced by acetylation of NRIP1 on multiple lysine residues, which increases the affinity for the PLDLS‑binding cleft of CtBP. CtBP in turn recruits histone deacetylases (HDAC1, HDAC2, HDAC5) and other chromatin‑modifying factors, forming a compact silencing complex.

=== Other functional motifs ===
A nuclear localization signal (NLS) is present in the N‑terminal region, ensuring that the protein resides predominantly in the nucleus. A 14‑3‑3 binding motif near the C‑terminus allows interaction with YWHAQ (14‑3‑3θ), which can relocalize NRIP1 to the cytoplasm under certain conditions. Several sumoylation and ubiquitination sites have been mapped, and these modifications influence protein stability and activity.

== Expression and transcriptional regulation ==
NRIP1 expression is tightly controlled at the transcriptional level. The core promoter contains a functional TATA box and multiple Sp1 binding sites. ERRα binds to an estrogen‑related receptor response element (ERRE) in the proximal promoter and strongly activates transcription during adipogenesis. This creates a negative‑feedback loop: ERRα promotes fat cell differentiation, and the resulting NRIP140 protein then limits the expression of ERRα target genes involved in mitochondrial oxidation, preventing excessive energy expenditure.

The glucocorticoid receptor also positively regulates NRIP1 expression in some tissues. In macrophages, NF-κB signaling upregulates the gene, linking NRIP1 to inflammatory pathways. Conversely, peroxisome proliferator‑activated receptor gamma (PPARγ) agonists may reduce NRIP1 levels in adipocytes, contributing to their insulin‑sensitizing effects.

At the post‑transcriptional level, microRNAs such as miR‑30b and miR‑33 have been predicted to target the 3′ untranslated region of the NRIP1 mRNA, though functional validation remains incomplete.

== Protein modifications and regulation of activity ==
NRIP1 is subject to extensive post‑translational modifications that modulate its stability, subcellular location, and interaction with coregulators.

=== Phosphorylation ===
Multiple serine and threonine residues are phosphorylated by kinases including ERK1/2, p38 MAPK, and protein kinase A. Phosphorylation can alter protein conformation and affect binding to nuclear receptors or corepressors. For example, ERK‑mediated phosphorylation of the central region enhances the recruitment of CtBP and strengthens repression.

=== Acetylation ===
Acetylation of lysine residues by acetyltransferases such as CBP/p300 promotes the interaction with CtBP. Conversely, sirtuin deacetylases (SIRT1) can remove these acetyl groups, reducing CtBP binding and thereby relieving repression. This provides a direct link between cellular energy status (NAD⁺ levels) and NRIP1 activity.

=== Sumoylation and ubiquitination ===
Sumoylation at lysine residues can promote stability or alter nuclear‑cytoplasmic shuttling. Poly‑ubiquitination targets the protein for proteasome‑mediated degradation. The ubiquitin ligase MDM2 has been shown to ubiquitinate NRIP1, reducing its half‑life in certain cancer cells.

=== Subcellular localization ===
In most cells, NRIP1 is predominantly nuclear. However, under certain conditions, such as activation of the glucocorticoid receptor, NRIP1 can be exported to the cytoplasm by binding to 14‑3‑3 proteins. This sequestration away from chromatin provides a rapid, reversible mechanism for relieving gene repression without protein degradation.

== Mechanism of transcriptional repression ==
NRIP1 is recruited to target promoters through its physical interaction with DNA‑bound transcription factors, primarily nuclear receptors. Once on the chromatin, it orchestrates a series of events that lead to gene silencing:

1. Competition with coactivators – The LXXLL motifs of NRIP1 compete with those of coactivators such as steroid receptor coactivator 1 (SRC‑1/NCOA1) for the same binding pocket on the receptor’s LBD. Because NRIP1 has multiple LXXLL motifs, it can effectively displace coactivators even at low stoichiometry.
2. Recruitment of CtBP and HDACs – The repression domains, especially RD3 and RD4, bind CtBP1/2. CtBP forms a complex that includes HDAC1, HDAC2, HDAC5, and other chromatin‑remodeling enzymes. This complex deacetylates histone H3 and H4, leading to chromatin compaction and transcriptional silencing.
3. Additional repressive activities – NRIP1 can also inhibit transcription independently of HDACs, perhaps by interfering with the assembly of the general transcription machinery or by modulating the activity of the Mediator complex.

In certain contexts, NRIP1 can act as a coactivator. The best‑characterized example is its interaction with the NF‑κB subunit RelA. NRIP1 binds RelA, prevents its sumoylation‑dependent inactivation, and promotes the recruitment of CBP/p300 to NF‑κB target promoters, thereby enhancing proinflammatory cytokine expression.

== Biological functions ==
=== Energy metabolism ===
NRIP1 is a master regulator of whole‑body energy balance. In white adipose tissue (WAT), it represses the expression of genes that promote mitochondrial uncoupling and fatty acid oxidation, such as uncoupling protein 1 (UCP1), carnitine palmitoyltransferase I (CPT1b), and the peroxisome proliferator‑activated receptor gamma coactivator 1‑alpha (PGC‑1α). By silencing these genes, NRIP1 favors lipid storage over energy dissipation.

In skeletal muscle, NRIP1 similarly suppresses oxidative metabolism. Muscle‑specific deletion of the gene leads to increased numbers of mitochondria, higher expression of oxidative phosphorylation enzymes, and greater endurance during exercise.

In the liver, NRIP1 represses genes involved in glycolysis, gluconeogenesis, and fatty acid oxidation. It is required for the full repression of hepatic glucose output by the liver X receptor (LXR).

=== Adipogenesis ===
During adipocyte differentiation, NRIP1 expression is dramatically upregulated. This increase limits the expression of brown‑fat‑like genes in white adipocytes. When NRIP1 is knocked down, differentiating preadipocytes acquire a more oxidative, brown‑fat‑like phenotype, with elevated UCP1 and increased mitochondrial DNA content.

=== Female fertility ===
Female NRIP1‑null mice are infertile because they fail to ovulate. In response to the luteinizing hormone surge, cumulus cells must undergo expansion, a process that requires the upregulation of amphiregulin and other EGF‑like factors. NRIP1 acts as a positive cofactor for certain transcription factors that drive amphiregulin expression, thus in this specific ovarian context it serves as a coactivator rather than a corepressor.

=== Cardiac function ===
NRIP1 influences cardiac metabolism and structure. Elevated NRIP1 expression in the heart, as observed in some transgenic models, leads to cardiac hypertrophy and impaired contractile function, likely due to a metabolic switch from fatty acid oxidation to glucose utilization. Conversely, cardiac‑specific deletion is protective against pressure‑overload‑induced heart failure in animal models.

=== Inflammation and immunity ===
In macrophages, NRIP1 acts as a coactivator for the NF‑κB subunit RelA, stimulating the expression of proinflammatory cytokines such as tumor necrosis factor (TNF), interleukin‑6 (IL‑6), and interleukin‑1β (IL‑1β). Mice lacking NRIP140 in myeloid cells show reduced systemic inflammation in models of sepsis and obesity‑induced insulin resistance. Thus, NRIP1 sits at the nexus of metabolism and immunity.

=== Circadian rhythm ===
NRIP1 interacts with the core clock component BMAL1 and represses the transcriptional activity of the CLOCK/BMAL1 heterodimer. It directly binds to E‑box elements in the promoters of clock genes such as PER1 and CRY1. Mice lacking NRIP1 display altered circadian behavior and dampened amplitude of peripheral clock gene oscillations. This links metabolic regulation directly to the circadian timing system.

=== Cell proliferation and cancer ===
NRIP1 can both suppress and promote tumorigenesis depending on the cellular context. It represses the activity of the E2F1 oncogene, and loss of NRIP1 in breast cancer leads to increased cell proliferation and a more aggressive basal‑like phenotype. Conversely, in some hormone‑dependent cancers, NRIP1 may enhance tumor growth by coactivating NF‑κB or by modulating estrogen receptor signaling. Its expression levels correlate with patient prognosis in breast, ovarian, and colorectal cancers.

== Interactions ==
NRIP1 interacts with a large network of proteins. The following table summarizes many of the key partners and the functional consequence of the interaction.

Key protein–protein interactions of NRIP1
Interacting protein	Functional consequence	Reference
Estrogen receptor alpha (ERα)	Recruitment to ERα‑target genes; corepression	
Glucocorticoid receptor (GR)	Repression of GR‑mediated transcription; 14‑3‑3‑dependent relocalization	
Retinoic acid receptor alpha (RARα)	Repression of retinoid‑dependent transcription	
Retinoid X receptor alpha (RXRα)	Heterodimer partner; RAR‑RXR corepression	
Peroxisome proliferator‑activated receptor alpha (PPARα)	Repression of lipid oxidation genes	
Liver X receptor alpha (LXRα)	Repression of hepatic lipogenesis	
Aryl hydrocarbon receptor (AhR)	Repression of AhR‑target genes	
Steroidogenic factor 1 (SF‑1/NR5A1)	Repression of steroidogenic genes	
DAX1 (NR0B1)	Co‑repression with SF‑1	
CTBP1 and CTBP2	Corepressor recruitment, histone deacetylation	
Histone deacetylase 5 (HDAC5)	Chromatin compaction	
HDAC1, HDAC2, HDAC3	Histone deacetylation	
RELA (NF‑κB subunit)	Coactivation of proinflammatory cytokines	
E2F1	Repression of cell‑cycle genes	
YWHAQ (14‑3‑3θ)	Cytoplasmic relocalization	

== Knockout and transgenic models ==
=== Whole‑body knockout ===
Mice with a global deletion of Nrip1 are viable but display a striking phenotype. They are lean, resistant to high‑fat‑diet‑induced obesity, and show improved glucose tolerance and insulin sensitivity. White fat depots are smaller, and gene expression analysis reveals a broad upregulation of oxidative metabolism and mitochondrial uncoupling genes. Female null mice are completely infertile due to a failure of ovulation.

=== Tissue‑specific knockouts ===
- Adipose‑specific KO – Recapitulates the lean phenotype and browning of white fat, confirming the cell‑autonomous role of NRIP1 in adipocytes.
- Muscle‑specific KO – Increases oxidative muscle fibers and endurance capacity.
- Myeloid‑specific KO – Protects against diet‑induced inflammation and insulin resistance.

=== Transgenic overexpression ===
Cardiac‑specific overexpression of NRIP1 leads to hypertrophy and heart failure, as noted. Overexpression in adipose tissue exacerbates obesity, while overexpression in cancer cells can either promote or suppress tumor growth depending on the cell type.

== Clinical significance ==
=== Obesity and type 2 diabetes ===
In morbidly obese humans, NRIP1 mRNA is downregulated in visceral adipose tissue, perhaps as a compensatory mechanism to increase energy expenditure. Genetic variations in the NRIP1 locus have been associated with altered body mass index and risk of type 2 diabetes in genome‑wide association studies, though the effect sizes are modest.

=== Cancer cachexia ===
NRIP1 is part of the signaling cascade that drives cachexia, the wasting syndrome seen in cancer and other chronic diseases. Upregulation of NRIP1 in muscle and fat leads to excessive energy expenditure and tissue breakdown. Blocking NRIP1 activity in animal models reduces cachexia‑associated weight loss.

=== Breast cancer ===
NRIP1 represses E2F1 activity, and its expression is frequently downregulated in basal‑like breast cancers, which are more aggressive and have a poor prognosis. Conversely, in luminal‑type breast cancers, higher NRIP1 levels correlate with a more differentiated phenotype and better survival. NRIP1 may therefore serve as a subtype‑specific prognostic marker.

=== Inflammatory diseases ===
Given its role in NF‑κB signaling, NRIP1 is implicated in chronic inflammatory conditions such as rheumatoid arthritis, inflammatory bowel disease, and atherosclerosis. Macrophage‑specific deletion of NRIP1 reduces plaque formation in mouse models of atherosclerosis.

=== Aging ===
NRIP1 expression changes during aging in a tissue‑specific manner. In mouse liver, NRIP1 levels increase with age, potentially contributing to age‑related metabolic dysfunction and insulin resistance.

== Evolutionary conservation ==
NRIP1 orthologs are found throughout the vertebrate lineage, from fish to humans. The four repression domains and the LXXLL motifs are highly conserved, underscoring their functional importance. Invertebrates lack a clear NRIP1 ortholog, suggesting that this coregulator arose early in vertebrate evolution, perhaps in conjunction with the expansion of the nuclear receptor family. The mouse protein shares approximately 85% amino acid identity with the human protein. The gene is found in a syntenic chromosomal region on mouse chromosome 16 and chicken chromosome 1.

== Pharmacological targeting ==
Because NRIP1 deletion in mice produces a favorable metabolic profile (leanness, insulin sensitivity, resistance to obesity) without overt toxicity, there is considerable interest in developing small‑molecule inhibitors of NRIP1 for the treatment of type 2 diabetes and obesity. Efforts have focused on:

- Disrupting the interaction between NRIP1 and specific nuclear receptors, such as ERRa or PPARα, using peptides or peptidomimetics.
- Interfering with the NRIP1–CtBP interaction through small molecules that block the PLDLS‑binding pocket of CtBP.
- Promoting NRIP1 degradation via PROteolysis TArgeting Chimeras (PROTACs).

A few compounds have shown efficacy in cellular models, but none have yet entered clinical trials. Challenges include achieving tissue specificity and avoiding side effects in the ovary and immune system.

== History ==
NRIP1 was discovered in 1995 by Vincent Cavaillès and colleagues, who identified a 140 kDa protein that interacted with the estrogen receptor and modulated its transcriptional activity. The protein was initially named “receptor‑interacting protein 140” (RIP140). Subsequent work mapped the gene to chromosome 21 and revealed its ability to interact with many other nuclear receptors. The critical metabolic role emerged in 2004 when Malcolm Parker’s group reported that RIP140‑null mice were lean and resistant to obesity. The discovery of its coactivator function for NF‑κB in 2008 expanded the functional repertoire, and recent studies have connected NRIP1 to circadian rhythm and cancer metabolism.

== See also ==
- Transcription coregulator
- Nuclear receptor
- CtBP
- NF-κB
- Estrogen receptor
