= Sp8 transcription factor =

Protein-coding gene in the species Homo sapiens

SP8

Identifiers
- Aliases: SP8, BTD, Sp8 transcription factor
- External IDs: OMIM: 608306; MGI: 2443471; GeneCards: SP8

Gene location (Human)
Chr.	Chromosome 7 (human)
Band	7p21.1	Start	20,782,279 bp
Band	7p21.1	End	20,786,886 bp

Gene location (Mouse)
Chr.	Chromosome 12 (mouse)
Band	12|12 F2	Start	118,810,064 bp
Band	12|12 F2	End	118,816,311 bp
RNA expression pattern
Bgee	Human / Mouse (ortholog); Top expressed in: pancreatic ductal cell; sural nerve; testicle; ventricular zone; gonad; olfactory zone of nasal mucosa; ganglionic eminence; nasal epithelium; mucosa of paranasal sinus; muscle of thigh / Top expressed in: Rostral migratory stream; olfactory bulb; lateral septal nucleus; primitive streak; prostate; respiratory epithelium; olfactory epithelium; lobe of prostate; tail of embryo; ventricular zone; More reference expression data
BioGPS	n/a
Gene ontology
Molecular function	DNA binding; metal ion binding; nucleic acid binding; DNA-binding transcription factor activity, RNA polymerase II-specific
Cellular component	nucleus
Biological process	proximal/distal pattern formation; regulation of transcription, DNA-templated; dorsal/ventral pattern formation; embryonic limb morphogenesis; transcription, DNA-templated; regulation of transcription by RNA polymerase II
Sources:Amigo / QuickGO
Orthologs
Databases	NCBI: entry; OMA: entry
Species	Human	Mouse
Entrez	221833	320145
Ensembl	ENSG00000164651	ENSMUSG00000048562
UniProt	Q8IXZ3	Q8BMJ8
RefSeq (mRNA)	NM_182700; NM_198956	NM_177082; NM_001379379; NM_001379380
RefSeq (protein)	NP_874359; NP_945194	NP_796056; NP_001366308; NP_001366309
Location (UCSC)	Chr 7: 20.78 – 20.79 Mb	Chr 12: 118.81 – 118.82 Mb
PubMed search
- Wikidata
View/Edit Human	View/Edit Mouse

Transcription factor Sp8 also known as specificity protein 8 (SP-8) or Btd transcription factor (buttonhead) is a protein that in humans is encoded by the SP8 gene. Sp8 is a transcription factor in the Sp/KLF family.

== Function ==
Sp8 mediates limb outgrowth during early development. Sp8 deletion in mice resulted in severe exencephaly. Sp8 is a zinc-finger transcription factor. The structural difference between Sp8 and Sp9 is only one amino acid. These transcription factors are Apical Ectodermal Ridge (AER) specific in limb development. The Apical Ectodermal Ridge signaling is important for specification of distal limb structures. Sp8 and Sp9 mediate Fgf10 signaling, which in turn regulates Fgf8 expression (Fgf10→Fgf8). Fgf8 is essential for normal limb development, and without the presence of Fgf8 in early development, there would be a decreased length of the limb bud and possible failure of the limb tissue develop. Both Sp8 and Sp9 have been found in vertebrates. Although, so far only Sp8 has been proven to be present in invertebrates too. Under lab conditions, Sp8 replaced btd in Drosophila, showing that Sp8 and btd both have similar functions in limb development in both vertebrates and invertebrates. Gene knockdown in zebrafish displayed that Fgf8 expression is necessary for appendage development.
