= KLF14 =

Protein-coding gene in the species Homo sapiens

Identifiers
- Aliases: KLF14, BTEB5, Kruppel-like factor 14, Kruppel like factor 14
- External IDs: OMIM: 609393; MGI: 3577024; GeneCards: KLF14

Gene location (Human)
Chr.	Chromosome 7 (human)
Band	7q32.2	Start	130,730,697 bp
Band	7q32.2	End	130,734,207 bp

Gene location (Mouse)
Chr.	Chromosome 6 (mouse)
Band	6|6 A3.3	Start	30,932,958 bp
Band	6|6 A3.3	End	30,936,013 bp
RNA expression pattern
Bgee	Human / Mouse (ortholog); Top expressed in: gonad; testicle; right adrenal cortex; left adrenal gland; left adrenal cortex; muscle of thigh; gastrocnemius muscle; subcutaneous adipose tissue; skeletal muscle tissue; smooth muscle tissue / Top expressed in: pituitary gland; yolk sac; lumbar subsegment of spinal cord; embryo; umbilical cord; internal carotid artery; condyle; epididymis; fossa; efferent ductule; More reference expression data
BioGPS	n/a
Gene ontology
Molecular function	DNA binding; metal ion binding; nucleic acid binding; DNA-binding transcription activator activity, RNA polymerase II-specific; sequence-specific DNA binding; DNA-binding transcription factor activity, RNA polymerase II-specific; chromatin binding
Cellular component	nucleus
Biological process	regulation of transcription, DNA-templated; transcription, DNA-templated; transcription by RNA polymerase II; positive regulation of transcription by RNA polymerase II; positive regulation of sphingolipid mediated signaling pathway; regulation of transcription by RNA polymerase II
Sources:Amigo / QuickGO
Orthologs
Databases	NCBI: entry; OMA: entry
Species	Human	Mouse
Entrez	136259	619665
Ensembl	ENSG00000266265	ENSMUSG00000073209
UniProt	Q8TD94	Q19A41
RefSeq (mRNA)	NM_138693	NM_001135093
RefSeq (protein)	NP_619638	NP_001128565
Location (UCSC)	Chr 7: 130.73 – 130.73 Mb	Chr 6: 30.93 – 30.94 Mb
PubMed search
- Wikidata
View/Edit Human	View/Edit Mouse

Krüppel-like factor 14, also known as basic transcription element-binding protein 5 (BTEB5) is a protein that in humans is encoded by the KLF14 gene. The corresponding Klf14 mouse gene is known as Sp6.

== Function ==
KLF14 is a member of the Krüppel-like factor family of transcription factors. It regulates the transcription of various genes, including TGFβRII (the type II receptor for TGFβ). KLF14 is expressed in many tissues, lacks introns, and is subject to parent-specific expression.

KLF14 appears to be a master regulator of gene expression in adipose tissue.

== Protein structure ==
Like the other members of the KLF family, KLF14 has three zinc-finger domains near the C-terminus, all three of which are of the classical C_{2}H_{2} type. In the human, they are at amino acids 195–219, 225–249, and 255–277.

Human KLF14 is 323 amino acids in length, with a molecular weight of 33,124; in the mouse its length is 325.

== Clinical significance ==
There appears to be a connection between KLF14 and coronary artery disease, hypercholesterolemia and type 2 diabetes.
