= KLF5 =

Protein-coding gene in the species Homo sapiens

Identifiers
- Aliases: KLF5, BTEB2, CKLF, IKLF, Kruppel-like factor 5 (intestinal), Kruppel like factor 5
- External IDs: OMIM: 602903; MGI: 1338056; GeneCards: KLF5
Available structures
| PDB | Ortholog search: PDBe RCSB |
| PDB | List of PDB id codes 2EBT |

Gene location (Human)
| Chr. | Chromosome 13 (human) |
| Band | 13q22.1 | Start | 73,054,976 bp |
| Band | 13q22.1 | End | 73,077,541 bp |

Gene location (Mouse)
| Chr. | Chromosome 14 (mouse) |
| Band | 14|14 E2.2 | Start | 99,536,127 bp |
| Band | 14|14 E2.2 | End | 99,552,472 bp |
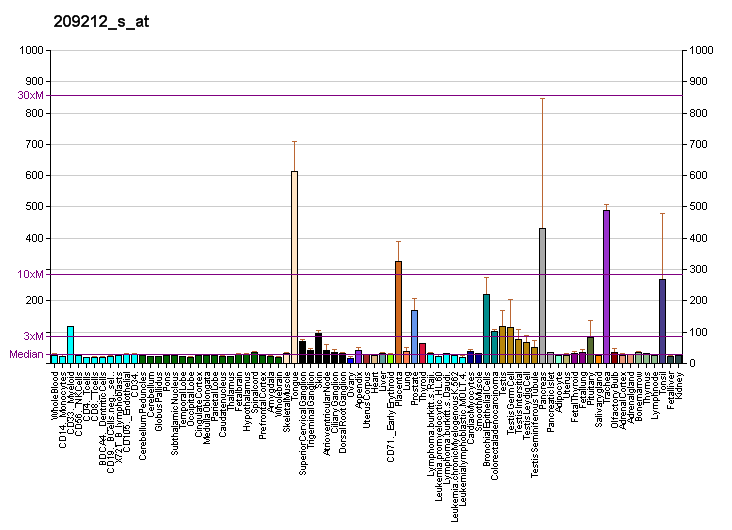

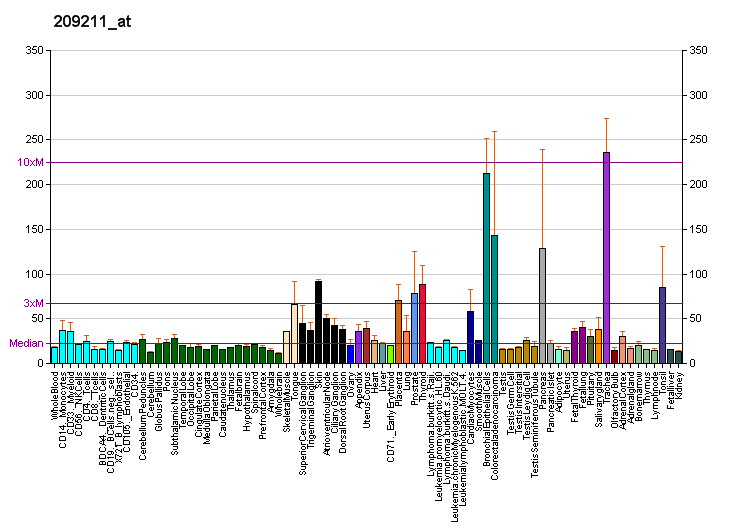
RNA expression pattern
| Bgee | Human / Mouse (ortholog); Top expressed in: epithelium of nasopharynx; gingival epithelium; human penis; mucosa of pharynx; amniotic fluid; mucosa of nose; mucosa of sigmoid colon; nipple; skin of abdomen; olfactory zone of nasal mucosa / Top expressed in: left colon; crypt of lieberkuhn of small intestine; gastrula; mucosa of urinary bladder; transitional epithelium of urinary bladder; migratory enteric neural crest cell; skin of external ear; conjunctival fornix; ileum; Paneth cell; More reference expression data |
| BioGPS | More reference expression data |
Gene ontology
| Molecular function | DNA binding; DNA-binding transcription factor activity; DNA-binding transcription activator activity, RNA polymerase II-specific; metal ion binding; RNA polymerase II cis-regulatory region sequence-specific DNA binding; protein binding; nucleic acid binding; sequence-specific DNA binding; DNA-binding transcription factor activity, RNA polymerase II-specific; transcription factor binding; MRF binding |
| Cellular component | Golgi apparatus; intracellular membrane-bounded organelle; nucleoplasm; nucleus; transcription regulator complex |
| Biological process | regulation of microvillus assembly; microvillus assembly; regulation of transcription, DNA-templated; intestinal epithelial cell development; regulation of transcription by RNA polymerase II; negative regulation of transcription by RNA polymerase II; transcription by RNA polymerase II; transcription, DNA-templated; positive regulation of transcription, DNA-templated; angiogenesis; skeletal muscle cell differentiation; positive regulation of fat cell differentiation; positive regulation of transcription by RNA polymerase II; cellular response to organic cyclic compound; positive regulation of cell population proliferation; cellular response to peptide; cellular response to leukemia inhibitory factor; cell-cell signaling via exosome; positive regulation of pri-miRNA transcription by RNA polymerase II; regulation of gene expression; skeletal muscle satellite cell differentiation; satellite cell activation involved in skeletal muscle regeneration; myotube differentiation involved in skeletal muscle regeneration; skeletal muscle tissue regeneration; positive regulation of transcription by transcription factor localization |
Sources:Amigo / QuickGO
Orthologs
| Databases | NCBI: entry; OMA: entry |
| Species | Human | Mouse |
| Entrez | 688 | 12224 |
| Ensembl | ENSG00000102554 | ENSMUSG00000005148 |
| UniProt | Q13887 | Q9Z0Z7 |
| RefSeq (mRNA) | NM_001730; NM_001286818 | NM_009769 |
| RefSeq (protein) | NP_001273747; NP_001721 | NP_033899 |
| Location (UCSC) | Chr 13: 73.05 – 73.08 Mb | Chr 14: 99.54 – 99.55 Mb |
| PubMed search |
- Wikidata
| View/Edit Human | View/Edit Mouse |

Krueppel-like factor 5 is a protein that in humans is encoded by the KLF5 gene.

== Function ==
This gene encodes a member of the Kruppel-like factor subfamily of zinc finger proteins. Since the protein localizes to the nucleus and binds the epidermal growth factor response element, it is thought to be a transcription factor.

== Interactions ==
KLF5 has been shown to interact with Protein SET.

== Clinical significance ==
KLF5 expression has been linked to higher survival rates for lung cancer patients.

== See also ==
- Kruppel-like factors
