= KLF6 =

Protein-coding gene in the species Homo sapiens

Identifiers
- Aliases: KLF6, BCD1, CBA1, COPEB, CPBP, GBF, PAC1, ST12, ZF9, Kruppel-like factor 6, Kruppel like factor 6
- External IDs: OMIM: 602053; MGI: 1346318; GeneCards: KLF6

Gene location (Human)
Chr.	Chromosome 10 (human)
Band	10p15.2	Start	3,775,996 bp
Band	10p15.2	End	3,785,281 bp

Gene location (Mouse)
Chr.	Chromosome 13 (mouse)
Band	13|13 A1	Start	5,911,481 bp
Band	13|13 A1	End	5,920,393 bp
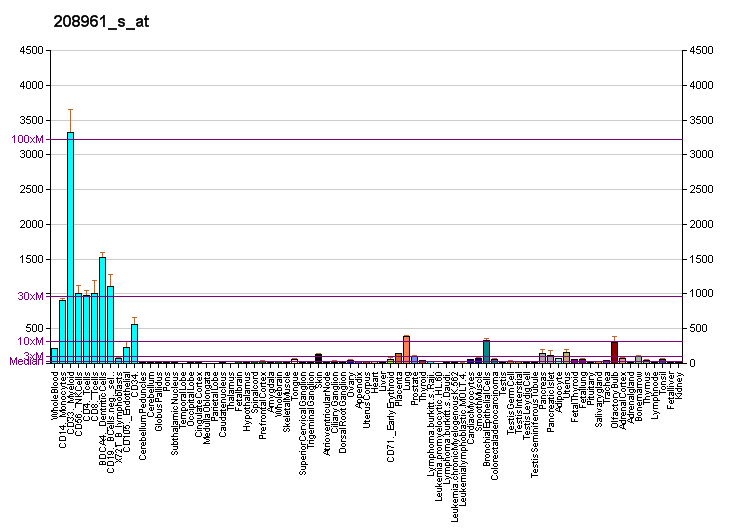

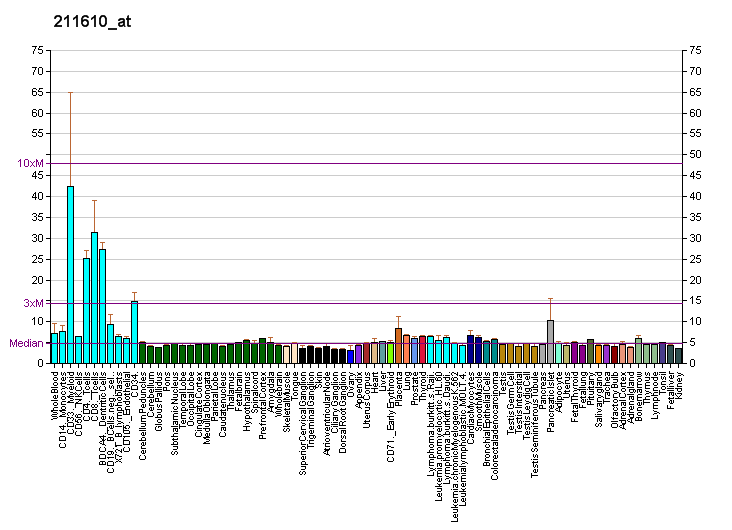

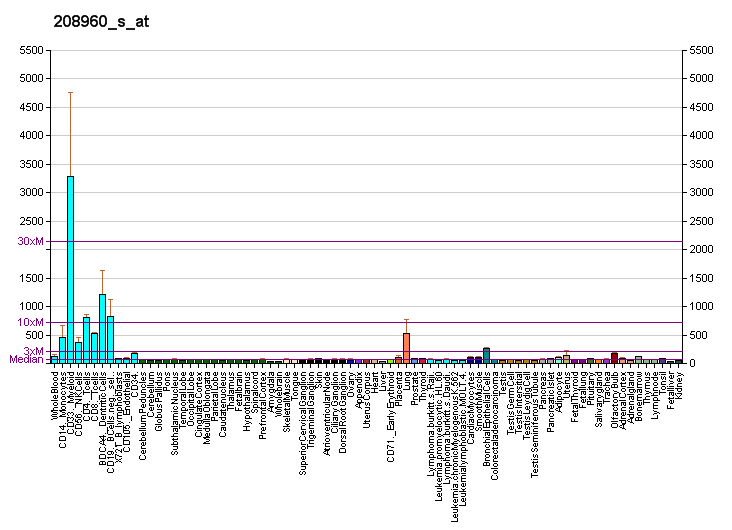
RNA expression pattern
Bgee	Human / Mouse (ortholog); Top expressed in: nipple; lower lobe of lung; skin of thigh; saphenous vein; vena cava; pericardium; gastric mucosa; skin of hip; monocyte; synovial joint / Top expressed in: granulocyte; stroma of bone marrow; aortic valve; ascending aorta; sciatic nerve; endothelial cell of lymphatic vessel; left colon; tunica media of zone of aorta; right lung lobe; blood; More reference expression data
BioGPS	More reference expression data
Gene ontology
Molecular function	DNA binding; protein binding; metal ion binding; nucleic acid binding; RNA polymerase II cis-regulatory region sequence-specific DNA binding; DNA-binding transcription activator activity, RNA polymerase II-specific; DNA-binding transcription factor activity, RNA polymerase II-specific; double-stranded DNA binding
Cellular component	fibrillar center; nucleus; nucleolus; cytosol; intracellular membrane-bounded organelle
Biological process	positive regulation of transcription, DNA-templated; B cell differentiation; regulation of transcription, DNA-templated; transcription, DNA-templated; positive regulation of transcription by RNA polymerase II; transcription by RNA polymerase II; regulation of transcription by RNA polymerase II; cytokine-mediated signaling pathway
Sources:Amigo / QuickGO
Orthologs
Databases	NCBI: entry; OMA: entry
Species	Human	Mouse
Entrez	1316	23849
Ensembl	ENSG00000067082	ENSMUSG00000000078
UniProt	Q99612	O08584; Q8BPQ2
RefSeq (mRNA)	NM_001008490; NM_001160124; NM_001160125; NM_001300	NM_011803
RefSeq (protein)	NP_001153596; NP_001153597; NP_001291	NP_035933
Location (UCSC)	Chr 10: 3.78 – 3.79 Mb	Chr 13: 5.91 – 5.92 Mb
PubMed search
- Wikidata
View/Edit Human	View/Edit Mouse

Krueppel-like factor 6 is a protein that in humans is encoded by the KLF6 gene.

It is a tumor suppressor gene.

== Function ==
This gene encodes a nuclear protein that has three zinc fingers at the end of its C-terminal domain, a serine/threonine-rich central region, and an acidic domain lying within the N-terminal region. The zinc fingers of this protein are responsible for the specific DNA binding with the guanine-rich core promoter elements. The central region might be involved in activation or posttranslational regulatory pathways, and the acidic N-terminal domain might play an important role in the process of transcriptional activation. It is capable of activating transcription approximately 4-fold either on homologous or heterologous promoters. The DNA binding and transcriptional activity of this protein, in conjunction with its expression pattern, suggests that this protein may participate in the regulation and/or maintenance of the basal expression of pregnancy-specific glycoprotein genes and possibly other TATA box-less genes. Two transcript variants encoding the same protein have been found for this gene.

== Interactions ==
KLF6 has been shown to interact with Sp1 transcription factor.

== See also ==
- Kruppel-like factors
