= ACTL6B =

Protein-coding gene in the species Homo sapiens

Identifiers
- Aliases: ACTL6B, ACTL6, BAF53B, arpNalpha, actin like 6B, EIEE76, IDDSSAD, DEE76, SMARCN2
- External IDs: OMIM: 612458; MGI: 1933548; GeneCards: ACTL6B

Gene location (Human)
Chr.	Chromosome 7 (human)
Band	7q22.1	Start	100,643,097 bp
Band	7q22.1	End	100,656,448 bp

Gene location (Mouse)
Chr.	Chromosome 5 (mouse)
Band	5|5 G2	Start	137,553,517 bp
Band	5|5 G2	End	137,569,582 bp
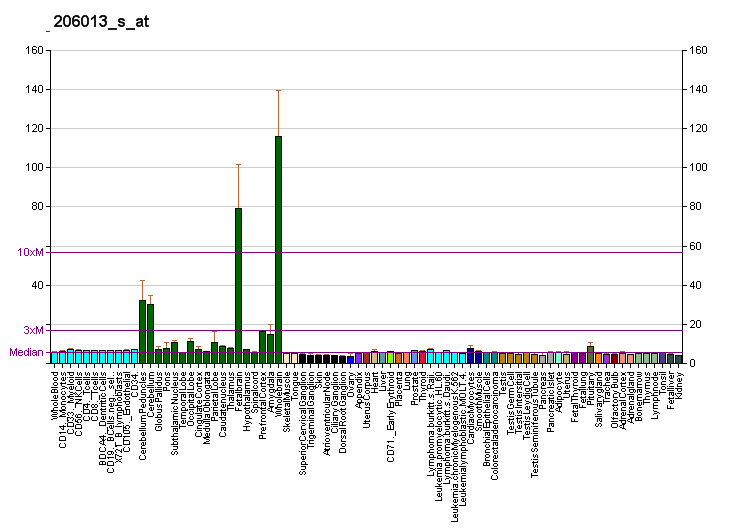

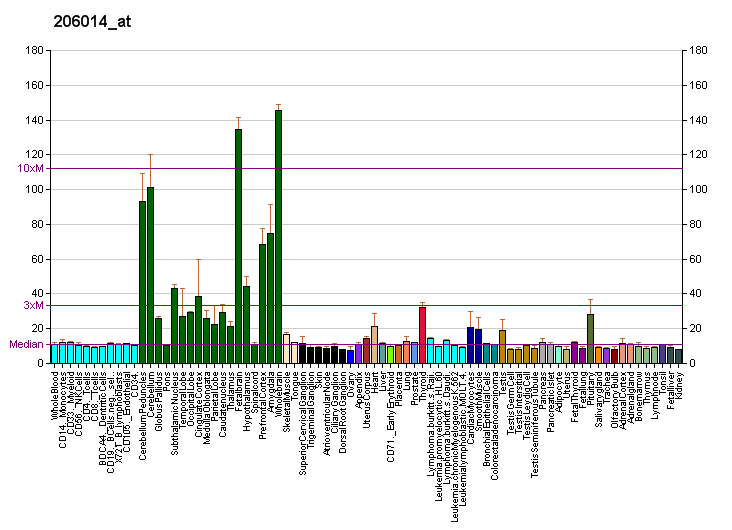
RNA expression pattern
Bgee	Human / Mouse (ortholog); Top expressed in: right hemisphere of cerebellum; right frontal lobe; ganglionic eminence; Brodmann area 9; prefrontal cortex; nucleus accumbens; cingulate gyrus; anterior cingulate cortex; putamen; caudate nucleus / Top expressed in: superior frontal gyrus; dentate gyrus of hippocampal formation granule cell; primary visual cortex; perirhinal cortex; subiculum; entorhinal cortex; cerebellar cortex; olfactory tubercle; dorsomedial hypothalamic nucleus; CA3 field; More reference expression data
BioGPS	More reference expression data
Gene ontology
Molecular function	structural constituent of cytoskeleton; transcription coactivator activity; chromatin binding
Cellular component	nucleus; nucleolus; nBAF complex; SWI/SNF complex; NuA4 histone acetyltransferase complex
Biological process	nervous system development; regulation of transcription, DNA-templated; spinal cord development; regulation of transcription by RNA polymerase II; transcription, DNA-templated; chromatin remodeling; cytoskeleton organization; chromatin organization; positive regulation of nucleic acid-templated transcription; histone H4 acetylation
Sources:Amigo / QuickGO
Orthologs
Databases	NCBI: entry; OMA: entry
Species	Human	Mouse
Entrez	51412	83766
Ensembl	ENSG00000077080	ENSMUSG00000029712
UniProt	O94805	Q99MR0
RefSeq (mRNA)	NM_016188	NM_031404
RefSeq (protein)	NP_057272	NP_113581
Location (UCSC)	Chr 7: 100.64 – 100.66 Mb	Chr 5: 137.55 – 137.57 Mb
PubMed search
- Wikidata
View/Edit Human	View/Edit Mouse

Actin-like protein 6B is a protein that in humans is encoded by the ACTL6B gene.

== Function ==
The protein encoded by this gene is a member of a family of actin-related proteins (ARPs) which share significant amino acid sequence identity to conventional actins. Both actins and ARPs have an actin fold, which is an ATP-binding cleft, as a common feature. The ARPs are involved in diverse cellular processes, including vesicular transport, spindle orientation, nuclear migration and chromatin remodeling. This gene encodes a subunit of the BAF (BRG1/brm-associated factor) complex in mammals, which is functionally related to SWI/SNF complex in S. cerevisiae and Drosophila; the latter is thought to facilitate transcriptional activation of specific genes by antagonizing chromatin-mediated transcriptional repression. This subunit may be involved in the regulation of genes by structural modulation of their chromatin, specifically in the brain.

== Interactions ==
ACTL6B has been shown to interact with CTBP1.
