= CBP =

CBP may refer to:

== Business parks ==
- Cebu Business Park, a central business district in Cebu City, Philippines
- Changi Business Park, an eco-friendly industrial park in Singapore
- Chiswick Business Park, a business park in Gunnersbury, West London

== Science and technology ==
- Contention based protocol
- CREB-binding protein a protein used in human transcriptional coactivation
- Calcium-binding protein
- Coded Block Pattern, a term used in video compression
- Constrained Baseline Profile, the simplest of H.264/MPEG-4 AVC profiles
- Chlorination by-product, a type of disinfection by-product

== Transport ==
- Cangzhou West railway station, China Railway telegraph code CBP
- Castle Bar Park railway station, National Rail station code CBP

== Other uses ==
- Captive bolt pistol
- Certified Benefits Professional, a certification for human-resource personnel
- Chorleywood bread process
- Citizens Bank Park, a baseball stadium used by the Philadelphia Phillies
- Columbia Basin Project, a large irrigation network in central Washington
- Compost bedded pack barn, a type of housing for dairy cattle
- Crippled Black Phoenix, a British rock band
- United States Customs and Border Protection, the largest federal law enforcement agency of the United States Department of Homeland Security
