= KLF10 =

Protein-coding gene in the species Homo sapiens

Identifiers
- Aliases: KLF10, EGR-alpha, EGRA, TIEG, TIEG1, Kruppel-like factor 10, Kruppel like factor 10
- External IDs: OMIM: 601878; MGI: 1101353; GeneCards: KLF10
Available structures
PDB	Ortholog search: PDBe RCSB
PDB	List of PDB id codes 2EPA

Gene location (Human)
Chr.	Chromosome 8 (human)
Band	8q22.3	Start	102,648,784 bp
Band	8q22.3	End	102,655,725 bp

Gene location (Mouse)
Chr.	Chromosome 15 (mouse)
Band	15|15 B3.1	Start	38,291,707 bp
Band	15|15 B3.1	End	38,300,950 bp
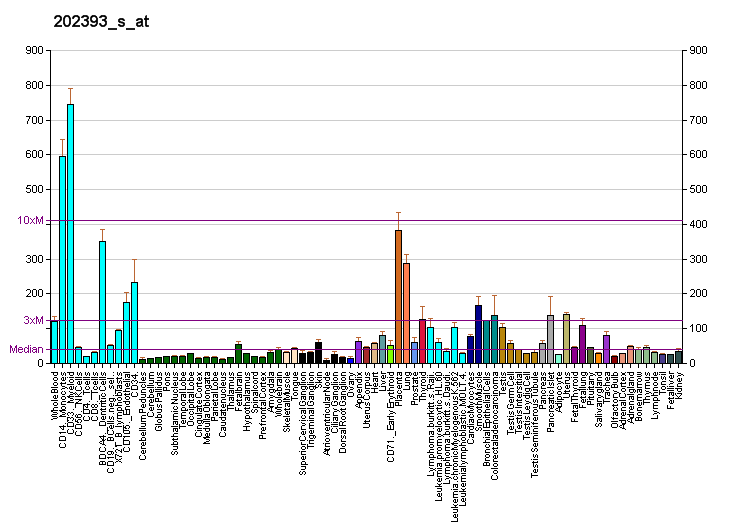
RNA expression pattern
Bgee	Human / Mouse (ortholog); Top expressed in: mucosa of paranasal sinus; skin of hip; skin of thigh; germinal epithelium; gastric mucosa; synovial joint; parietal pleura; saphenous vein; lactiferous duct; human penis / Top expressed in: spermatocyte; gastrula; urothelium; urinary bladder; transitional epithelium of urinary bladder; left lung lobe; renal corpuscle; stria vascularis; muscle of thigh; plantaris muscle; More reference expression data
BioGPS	More reference expression data
Gene ontology
Molecular function	DNA binding; DNA-binding transcription factor activity; metal ion binding; protein binding; nucleic acid binding; core promoter sequence-specific DNA binding; RNA polymerase II cis-regulatory region sequence-specific DNA binding; DNA-binding transcription activator activity, RNA polymerase II-specific; DNA-binding transcription factor activity, RNA polymerase II-specific
Cellular component	nucleus
Biological process	skeletal system development; bone mineralization; cellular response to peptide; regulation of transcription, DNA-templated; somatic stem cell population maintenance; rhythmic process; cell-cell signaling; positive regulation of osteoclast differentiation; negative regulation of transcription by RNA polymerase II; transcription, DNA-templated; circadian rhythm; cell population proliferation; transforming growth factor beta receptor signaling pathway; negative regulation of cell population proliferation; cellular response to starvation; regulation of circadian rhythm; negative regulation of transcription, DNA-templated; transcription by RNA polymerase II; positive regulation of transcription by RNA polymerase II; regulation of transcription by RNA polymerase II
Sources:Amigo / QuickGO
Orthologs
Databases	NCBI: entry; OMA: entry
Species	Human	Mouse
Entrez	7071	21847
Ensembl	ENSG00000155090	ENSMUSG00000037465
UniProt	Q13118	O89091
RefSeq (mRNA)	NM_001032282; NM_005655	NM_001289471; NM_013692; NM_001357677
RefSeq (protein)	NP_001027453; NP_005646	NP_001276400; NP_038720; NP_001344606
Location (UCSC)	Chr 8: 102.65 – 102.66 Mb	Chr 15: 38.29 – 38.3 Mb
PubMed search
- Wikidata
View/Edit Human	View/Edit Mouse

Krueppel-like factor 10 is a protein that in humans is encoded by the KLF10 gene.

== See also ==
- Kruppel-like factors
