= KLF4 =

Protein-coding gene in the species Homo sapiens

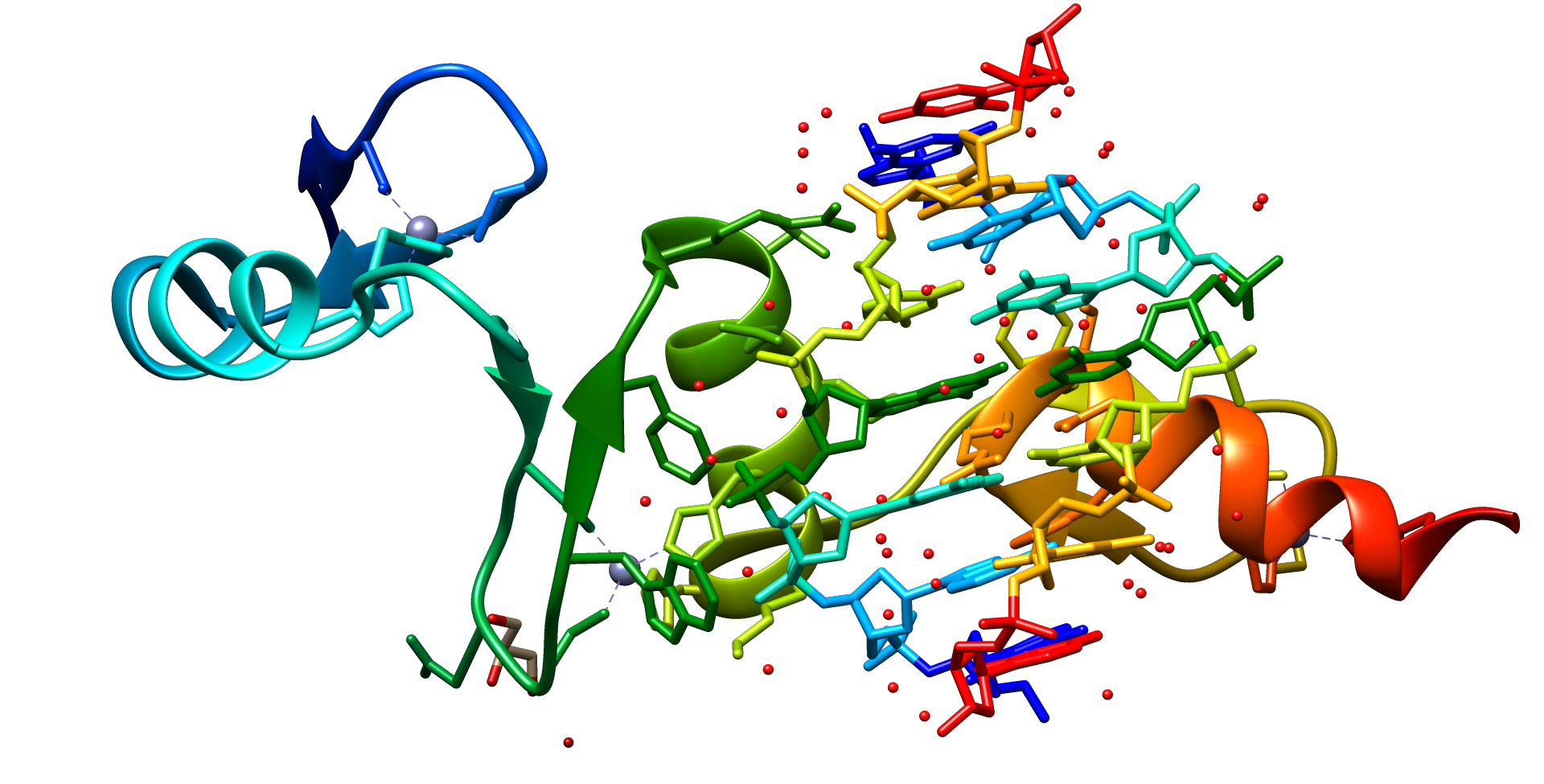

Identifiers
- Aliases: KLF4, EZF, GKLF, Kruppel-like factor 4 (gut), Kruppel like factor 4
- External IDs: OMIM: 602253; MGI: 1342287; GeneCards: KLF4
Available structures
PDB	Ortholog search: PDBe RCSB
PDB	List of PDB id codes 2WBS, 2WBU, 4M9E

Gene location (Human)
Chr.	Chromosome 9 (human)
Band	9q31.2	Start	107,484,852 bp
Band	9q31.2	End	107,490,482 bp

Gene location (Mouse)
Chr.	Chromosome 4 (mouse)
Band	4 B3|4 29.76 cM	Start	55,527,143 bp
Band	4 B3|4 29.76 cM	End	55,532,466 bp
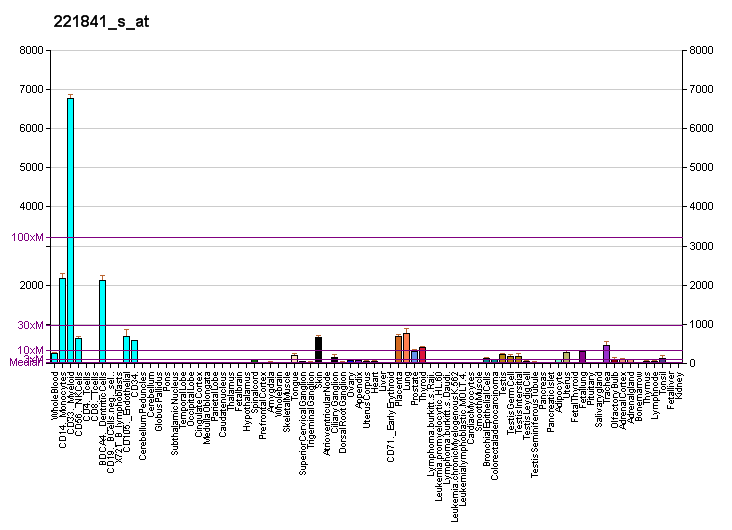

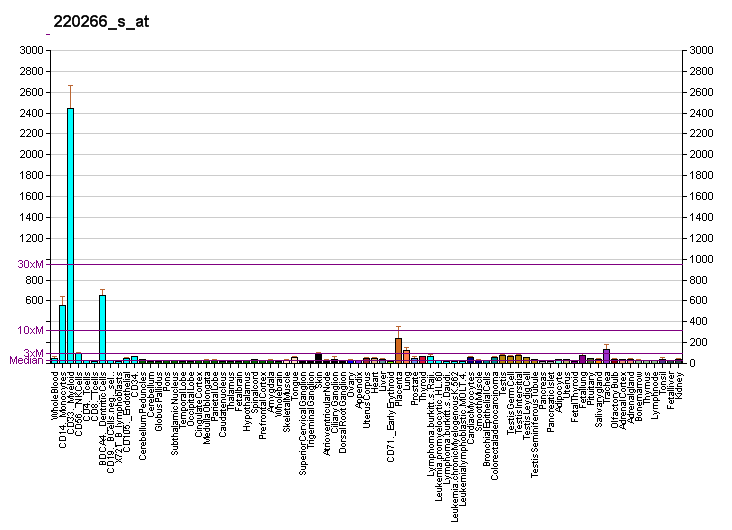
RNA expression pattern
Bgee	Human / Mouse (ortholog); Top expressed in: skin of thigh; skin of hip; human penis; mucosa of sigmoid colon; synovial joint; skin of arm; skin of abdomen; vulva; jejunal mucosa; mucosa of pharynx / Top expressed in: epithelium of stomach; mucous cell of stomach; skin of external ear; conjunctival fornix; left colon; pyloric antrum; intestinal villus; umbilical cord; cervix; stria vascularis; More reference expression data
BioGPS	More reference expression data
Gene ontology
Molecular function	DNA binding; sequence-specific DNA binding; beta-catenin binding; phosphatidylinositol 3-kinase regulator activity; DNA-binding transcription factor activity; zinc ion binding; DNA-binding transcription activator activity, RNA polymerase II-specific; transcription factor binding; cis-regulatory region sequence-specific DNA binding; metal ion binding; RNA polymerase II sequence-specific DNA-binding transcription factor recruiting activity; protein binding; nucleic acid binding; double-stranded DNA binding; promoter-specific chromatin binding; RNA polymerase II cis-regulatory region sequence-specific DNA binding; DNA-binding transcription factor activity, RNA polymerase II-specific; transcription coregulator binding; histone deacetylase binding
Cellular component	cytoplasm; transcription regulator complex; nucleoplasm; chromatin; nucleus
Biological process	negative regulation of chemokine (C-X-C motif) ligand 2 production; epidermal cell differentiation; cellular response to retinoic acid; negative regulation of protein kinase B signaling; negative regulation of muscle hyperplasia; negative regulation of smooth muscle cell proliferation; positive regulation of protein metabolic process; negative regulation of cysteine-type endopeptidase activity involved in apoptotic process; regulation of axon regeneration; cellular response to peptide; regulation of transcription, DNA-templated; positive regulation of hemoglobin biosynthetic process; response to retinoic acid; somatic stem cell population maintenance; cellular response to laminar fluid shear stress; regulation of transcription by RNA polymerase II; cell differentiation; epidermis morphogenesis; positive regulation of nitric oxide biosynthetic process; cellular response to growth factor stimulus; cellular response to organic cyclic compound; post-embryonic hemopoiesis; negative regulation of transcription by RNA polymerase II; transcription by RNA polymerase II; response to organic substance; negative regulation of gene expression; negative regulation of response to cytokine stimulus; transcription, DNA-templated; negative regulation of DNA-binding transcription factor activity; negative regulation of phosphatidylinositol 3-kinase signaling; stem cell population maintenance; negative regulation of cell migration involved in sprouting angiogenesis; positive regulation of gene expression; negative regulation of cell migration; regulation of cell population proliferation; post-embryonic camera-type eye development; regulation of phosphatidylinositol 3-kinase activity; positive regulation of telomerase activity; canonical Wnt signaling pathway; negative regulation of ERK1 and ERK2 cascade; regulation of cell differentiation; mesodermal cell fate determination; negative regulation of heterotypic cell-cell adhesion; negative regulation of transcription, DNA-templated; negative regulation of NF-kappaB transcription factor activity; cellular response to cycloheximide; negative regulation of inflammatory response; fat cell differentiation; positive regulation of transcription by RNA polymerase II; negative regulation of cell population proliferation; cellular response to hydrogen peroxide; negative regulation of leukocyte adhesion to arterial endothelial cell; positive regulation of core promoter binding; cellular response to leukemia inhibitory factor; negative regulation of angiogenesis; pri-miRNA transcription by RNA polymerase II; negative regulation of G1/S transition of mitotic cell cycle; positive regulation of transcription, DNA-templated; positive regulation of sprouting angiogenesis
Sources:Amigo / QuickGO
Orthologs
Databases	NCBI: entry; OMA: entry
Species	Human	Mouse
Entrez	9314	16600
Ensembl	ENSG00000136826	ENSMUSG00000003032
UniProt	O43474	Q60793
RefSeq (mRNA)	NM_001314052; NM_004235	NM_010637
RefSeq (protein)	NP_001300981; NP_004226	NP_034767
Location (UCSC)	Chr 9: 107.48 – 107.49 Mb	Chr 4: 55.53 – 55.53 Mb
PubMed search
- Wikidata
View/Edit Human	View/Edit Mouse

Krüppel-like factor 4 (KLF4; gut-enriched Krüppel-like factor or GKLF) is a member of the KLF family of zinc finger transcription factors, which belongs to the relatively large family of SP1-like transcription factors. KLF4 is involved in the regulation of proliferation, differentiation, apoptosis and somatic cell reprogramming. Evidence also suggests that KLF4 is a tumor suppressor in certain cancers, including colorectal cancer. It has three Cys_{2}His_{2}-zinc fingers at its carboxyl terminus that are closely related to another KLF, KLF2. It has two nuclear localization sequences that signals it to localize to the nucleus. In embryonic stem cells (ESCs), KLF4 has been demonstrated to be a good indicator of stem-like capacity. It is suggested that the same is true in mesenchymal stem cells.

In humans, the protein is 513 amino acids, with a predicted molecular weight of approximately 55kDa, and is encoded by the KLF4 gene. The KLF4 gene is conserved in chimpanzee, rhesus monkey, dog, cow, mouse, rat, chicken, zebrafish, and frog. KLF4 was first identified in 1996.

== Interactions ==
KLF4 can activate transcription by interacting via its N-terminus with specific transcriptional co-activators, such as p300-CBP coactivator family. Transcriptional repression by KLF4 is carried out by KLF4 competing with an activator for binding to a target DNA sequence (9-12). KLF4 has been shown to interact with CREB-binding protein. Furthermore, KLF4 has also been documented to play a role in long range chromatin interactions across the genome. KLF4 has been shown to play a role in methylation of chromatin thus contributing to higher order architectural changes across the genome. Specifically, KLF4 has been shown to bind to methylated gene motifs causing switching from repressive to active chromatin markers, and causing downstream enhanced transcription of KLF4 gene targets. KLF4 has also been documented to interact with protein arginine methyltransferase 1 (Prmt1), which is involved in post-translational modifications in regards to cell fate decisions via methylation of histones. It has been shown that KLF4 is methylated by Prmt1 and the methylation of KLF4 by Prmt1 prevents the emergence of primitive endoderm progenitor cells, thus showing the role in which KLF4 interactions play with cell development.

== Function ==
KLF4 has diverse functions, and has gained attention because some of its functions are apparently contradictory, but mainly since the discovery of its integral role as one of four key factors that are essential for inducing pluripotent stem cells. KLF4 is highly expressed in non-dividing cells and its overexpression induces cell cycle arrest. KLF4 is particularly important in preventing cell division when the DNA is damaged. KLF4 is also important in regulating centrosome number and chromosome number (genetic stability), and in promoting cell survival. However, some studies have revealed that under certain conditions KLF4 may switch its role from pro-cell survival to pro-cell death.

KLF4 is expressed in the cells that are non-dividing and are terminally differentiated in the intestinal epithelium, where KLF4 is important in the regulation of intestinal epithelium homeostasis (terminal cell differentiation and proper localization of the different intestinal epithelium cell types). In the intestinal epithelium, KLF4 is an important regulator of Wnt signaling pathway genes of genes regulating differentiation.

KLF4 is expressed in a variety of tissues and organs such as: the cornea where it is required for epithelial barrier function and is a regulator of genes required for corneal homeostasis; the skin where it is required for the development of skin permeability barrier function; the bone and teeth tissues where it regulates normal skeletal development; epithelial cell of the mouse male and female reproductive tract where in the males it is important for proper spermatogenesis; vascular endothelial cells where it is critical in preventing vascular leakage in response to inflammatory stimuli; white blood cells where it mediates inflammatory responses cellular differentiation and proliferation; the kidneys where it is involved in the differentiation of embryonic stem cells and induced pluripotent stem (iPS) cells to renal lineage in vitro and its dysregulation has been linked to some renal pathologies.

== Roles in diseases ==
Several lines of evidence have shown that KLF4 role in disease is context dependent where under certain conditions it may play one role and under different conditions it may assume a complete opposite role.

KLF4 is an anti-tumorigenic factor and its expression is often lost in various human cancer types, such as Colorectal cancer, gastric cancer, esophageal squamous cell carcinoma, intestinal cancer, prostate cancer, bladder cancer and lung cancer.

However, in some cancer types KLF4 may act as a tumor promoter where increased KLF4 expression has been reported, such as in oral squamous cell carcinoma and in primary breast ductal carcinoma. Also, overexpression of KLF4 in skin resulted in hyperplasia and dysplasia, which lead to the development of squamous cell carcinoma. Similar finding in esophageal epithelium was observed, where overexpression of KLF4 resulted in increased inflammation that eventually lead to the development of esophageal squamous cell cancer in mice.

The role of KLF4 in Epithelial–mesenchymal transition (EMT) is also controversial. It was shown to stimulate EMT in some systems by promoting/maintaining stemness of cancer cells, as is the case in pancreatic cancer, head and neck cancer, endometrial cancer, nasopharyngeal cancer, prostate cancer and non-small lung cancer. Under conditions of TGFβ-induced EMT KLF4 was shown to suppress EMT in the same systems where it was shown to promote EMT, such as prostate cancer and pancreatic cancer. Additionally, KLF4 was shown to suppress EMT in epidermal cancer, breast cancer, lung cancer, cisplatin-resistant nasopharyngeal carcinoma cells, and in hepatocellular carcinoma cells.

KLF4 plays an important role in several vascular diseases where it was shown to regulate vascular inflammation by controlling macrophage polarization and plaque formation in atherosclerosis. It up-regulates Apolipoprotein E, which is an anti-atherosclerotic factor. It is also involved in the regulation of angiogenesis. It may suppress angiogenesis by regulating NOTCH1 activity, while in the central nervous system its overexpression leads to vascular dysplasia.

KLF4 may promote inflammation by mediating NF-κB-dependent inflammatory pathway such as in macrophages, esophageal epithelium and in chemically-induced acute colitis in mice. Additionally, KLF-4 downregulates TNF-α-induced VCAM1 expression by targeting and blocking the binding site of NF-κB to the VCAM1 promoter.

However, KLF4 may also suppress the activation of inflammatory signaling such as in endothelial cells in response to pro-inflammatory stimuli.

KLF4 is essential for the cellular response to DNA damage. It is required for preventing cell cycle entry into mitosis following γ-irradiation-induced DNA damage, in promoting DNA repair mechanisms (20) and in preventing the irradiated cell from undergoing programmed cell death (apoptosis) (23,25,26). In one study, the in vivo importance of KLF4 in response to γ-irradiation-induced DNA damage was revealed where deletion of KLF4 specifically from the intestinal epithelium in mice lead to inability of the intestinal epithelium to regenerate and resulting in increased mortality of these mice.

== Importance in stem cells ==
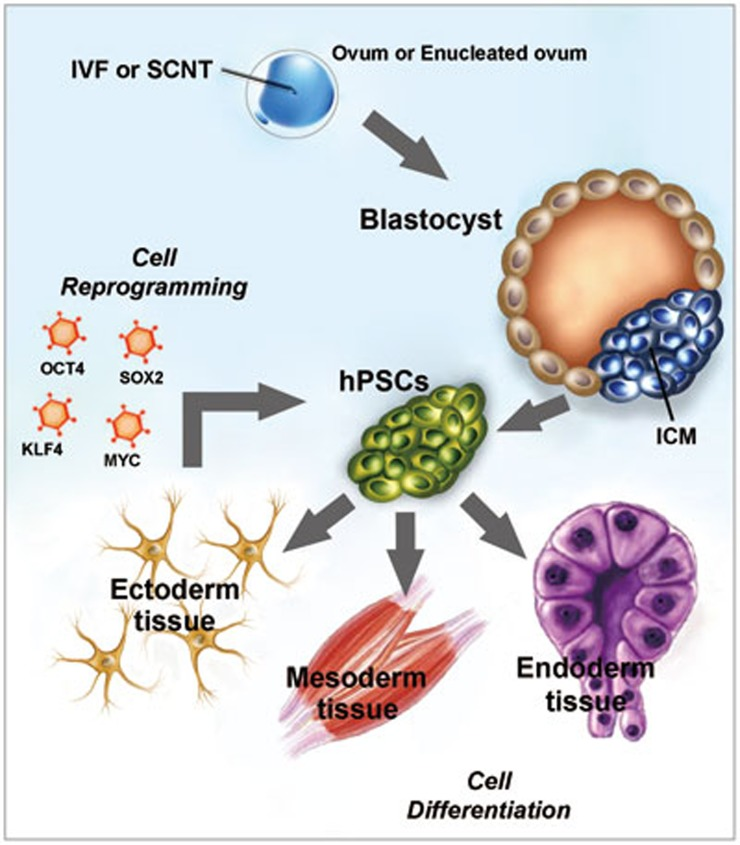
KLF4 in post-translational modification of stem cells

Research has proposed there to be four main factors that have the ability to reprogram differentiated cells back into an embryonic stem cell-like state through the introduction of the Yamanaka factors, Oct4, Sox2, c-Myc, and KLF4. While not as frequently studied as Oct4 and Sox2, KLF4 has become of interest in regards to stem cells due to its complex abilities regarding cell fate and cell potency. Specifically, it has been shown how KLF4 alone can affect a cell's level of potency, for instance, rapid KLF4 gene down regulation occurs during both serum and serum free differentiation conditions of embryoid bodies. Furthermore, embryonic stem cells over expressing KLF4 demonstrated reduced differentiation, along with a greater capacity to self renew

Since 2006 up to today, the work on clinically relevant research in stem cells and stem cell induction, has increased dramatically (more than 10,000 research articles, as compared to about 60 between years 1900 to 2005). In vivo functional studies on the role of KLF4 in stem cells are rare. Recently a group investigated the role of KLF4 in a particular population of intestinal stem cells, the Bmi1+ stem cells. This population of intestinal stem cells: are normally slow dividing, are known to be resistant to radiation injury, and are the ones responsible for intestinal epithelium regeneration following radiation injury. The study showed that in the intestine, following γ-irradiation-induced DNA damage, KLF4 may regulate epithelial regeneration by modulating the fate of Bmi1+((BMI1)) stem cells themselves, and consequently the development of Bmi1+ + intestinal stem cell-derived lineage.

== See also ==
- Kruppel-like factors
