= KLF12 =

Protein-coding gene in the species Homo sapiens

Identifiers
- Aliases: KLF12, AP-2rep, AP2REP, HSPC122, Kruppel-like factor 12, Kruppel like factor 12
- External IDs: OMIM: 607531; MGI: 1333796; GeneCards: KLF12

Gene location (Human)
Chr.	Chromosome 13 (human)
Band	13q22.1	Start	73,686,089 bp
Band	13q22.1	End	74,133,929 bp

Gene location (Mouse)
Chr.	Chromosome 14 (mouse)
Band	14 E2.2-E2.3|14 50.9 cM	Start	99,870,632 bp
Band	14 E2.2-E2.3|14 50.9 cM	End	100,284,679 bp
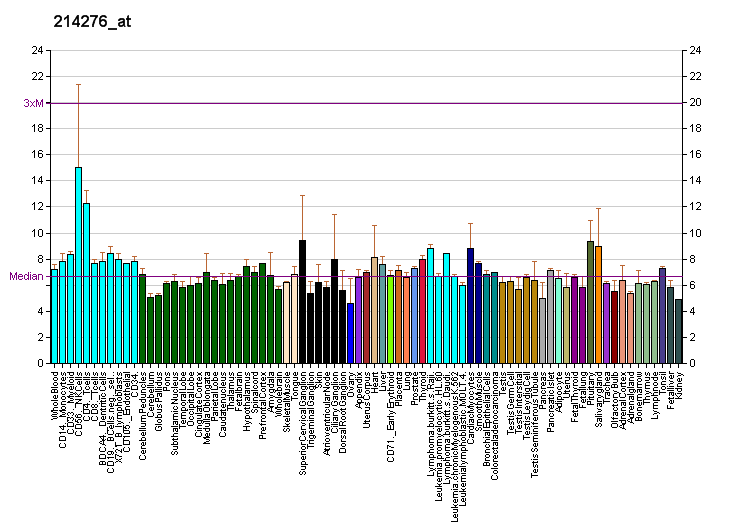

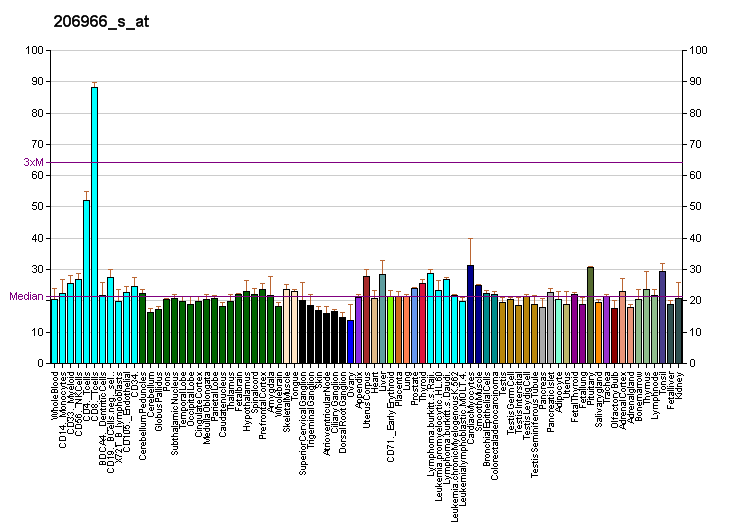

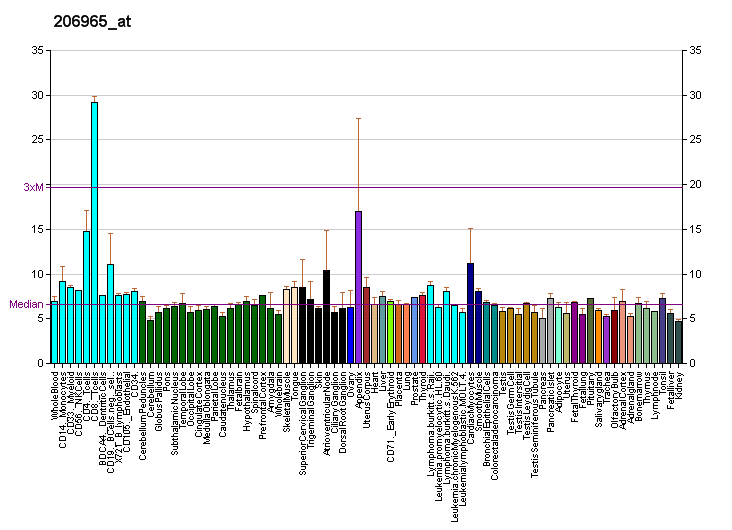
RNA expression pattern
Bgee	Human / Mouse (ortholog); Top expressed in: corpus epididymis; superficial temporal artery; retinal pigment epithelium; caput epididymis; Brodmann area 23; biceps brachii; Skeletal muscle tissue of biceps brachii; tendon of biceps brachii; epithelium of nasopharynx; synovial joint / Top expressed in: Rostral migratory stream; human fetus; tail of embryo; genital tubercle; retinal pigment epithelium; dorsal tegmental nucleus; habenula; lateral septal nucleus; lateral geniculate nucleus; medial geniculate nucleus; More reference expression data
BioGPS	More reference expression data
Gene ontology
Molecular function	DNA binding; protein binding; transcription corepressor activity; metal ion binding; nucleic acid binding; DNA-binding transcription factor activity; DNA-binding transcription factor activity, RNA polymerase II-specific; RNA polymerase II transcription regulatory region sequence-specific DNA binding; DNA-binding transcription repressor activity, RNA polymerase II-specific
Cellular component	nucleus; nucleoplasm; cytosol
Biological process	regulation of transcription by RNA polymerase II; regulation of transcription, DNA-templated; transcription, DNA-templated; negative regulation of transcription by RNA polymerase II; positive regulation of transcription by RNA polymerase II
Sources:Amigo / QuickGO
Orthologs
Databases	NCBI: entry; OMA: entry
Species	Human	Mouse
Entrez	11278	16597
Ensembl	ENSG00000118922	ENSMUSG00000072294
UniProt	Q9Y4X4	O35738
RefSeq (mRNA)	NM_007249; NM_016285	NM_010636
RefSeq (protein)	NP_009180	NP_034766
Location (UCSC)	Chr 13: 73.69 – 74.13 Mb	Chr 14: 99.87 – 100.28 Mb
PubMed search
- Wikidata
View/Edit Human	View/Edit Mouse

Krueppel-like factor 12 is a protein that in humans is encoded by the KLF12 gene.

Activator protein-2 alpha (AP-2 alpha) is a developmentally-regulated transcription factor and important regulator of gene expression during vertebrate development and carcinogenesis. The protein encoded by this gene is a member of the Kruppel-like zinc finger protein family and can repress expression of the AP-2 alpha gene by binding to a specific site in the AP-2 alpha gene promoter. Repression by the encoded protein requires binding with a corepressor, CtBP1. Two transcript variants encoding different isoforms have been found for this gene.

== See also ==
- Kruppel-like factors
