= Adipolin =

Protein found in humans

C1QTNF12

Identifiers
- Aliases: C1QTNF12, C1QDC2, CTRP12, FAM132A, family with sequence similarity 132 member A, C1q and TNF related 12
- External IDs: OMIM: 616593; MGI: 1914639; GeneCards: C1QTNF12

Gene location (Human)
Chr.	Chromosome 1 (human)
Band	1p36.33	Start	1,242,446 bp
Band	1p36.33	End	1,246,722 bp

Gene location (Mouse)
Chr.	Chromosome 4 (mouse)
Band	4 E2|4 87.66 cM	Start	156,046,775 bp
Band	4 E2|4 87.66 cM	End	156,051,086 bp
RNA expression pattern
Bgee	Human / Mouse (ortholog); Top expressed in: mucosa of transverse colon; mucosa of ileum; jejunal mucosa; duodenum; testicle; gonad; skin of abdomen; gastric mucosa; skin of limb; skin of leg / Top expressed in: medullary collecting duct; renal corpuscle; Epithelium of choroid plexus; efferent ductule; condyle; fossa; retinal pigment epithelium; Paneth cell; brown adipose tissue; external carotid artery; More reference expression data
BioGPS	n/a
Gene ontology
Molecular function	hormone activity
Cellular component	extracellular region; extracellular space
Biological process	positive regulation of glucose import; negative regulation of gluconeogenesis; positive regulation of insulin secretion involved in cellular response to glucose stimulus; positive regulation of insulin receptor signaling pathway; positive regulation of protein kinase B signaling; regulation of glucose metabolic process; negative regulation of inflammatory response; regulation of glucose import; regulation of signaling receptor activity; signal transduction
Sources:Amigo / QuickGO
Orthologs
Databases	NCBI: entry; OMA: entry
Species	Human	Mouse
Entrez	388581	67389
Ensembl	ENSG00000184163	ENSMUSG00000023571
UniProt	Q5T7M4	Q8R2Z0
RefSeq (mRNA)	NM_001014980	NM_026125
RefSeq (protein)	NP_001014980	NP_080401
Location (UCSC)	Chr 1: 1.24 – 1.25 Mb	Chr 4: 156.05 – 156.05 Mb
PubMed search
- Wikidata
View/Edit Human	View/Edit Mouse

Adipolin is a protein that in humans is encoded by the C1QTNF12 gene. It is predicted to be a hormone which suppress glucose production by liver cells. It may also be an adipokine (meaning a hormone produced by fat cells), and may also function to increase the amount of glucose taken in by fat cells.
