= Transcription factor Sp1 =

Protein-coding gene in the species Homo sapiens

SP1
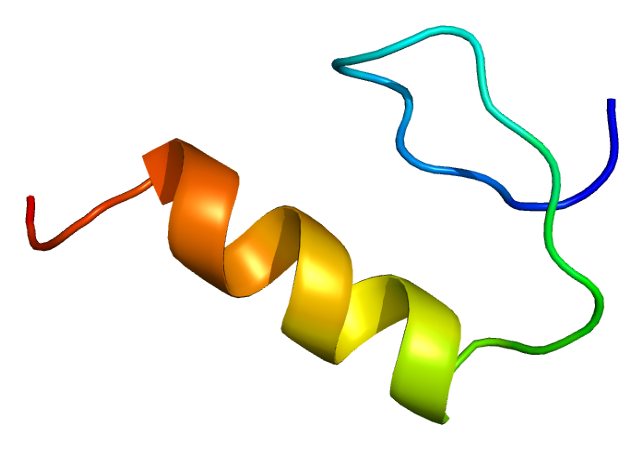

Identifiers
- Aliases: SP1, entrez:6667, Sp1 transcription factor
- External IDs: OMIM: 189906; MGI: 98372; GeneCards: SP1
Available structures
PDB	Ortholog search: PDBe RCSB
PDB	List of PDB id codes 1SP1, 1SP2, 1VA1, 1VA2, 1VA3

Gene location (Human)
Chr.	Chromosome 12 (human)
Band	12q13.13	Start	53,380,176 bp
Band	12q13.13	End	53,416,446 bp

Gene location (Mouse)
Chr.	Chromosome 15 (mouse)
Band	15|15 F3	Start	102,314,578 bp
Band	15|15 F3	End	102,344,839 bp
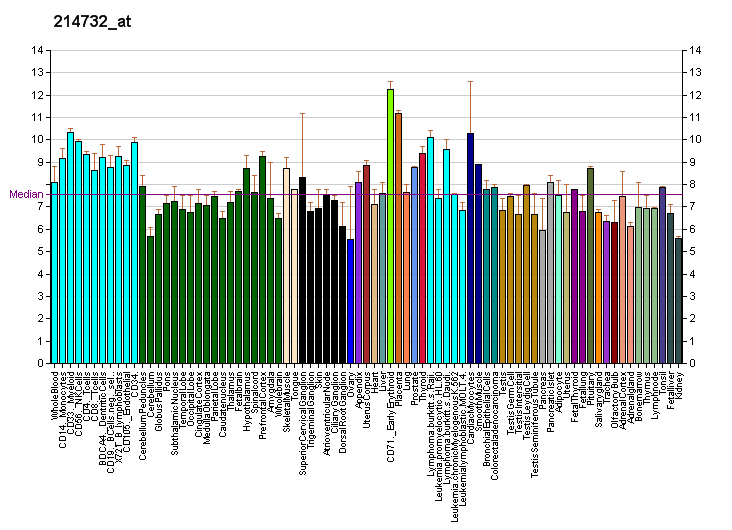
RNA expression pattern
Bgee	Human / Mouse (ortholog); Top expressed in: nipple; trabecular bone; skin of hip; epithelium of colon; monocyte; vulva; skin of thigh; lactiferous duct; cardia; tonsil / Top expressed in: Rostral migratory stream; vas deferens; human fetus; conjunctival fornix; internal carotid artery; hair follicle; ciliary body; skin of external ear; lacrimal gland; external carotid artery; More reference expression data
BioGPS	More reference expression data
Gene ontology
Molecular function	protein homodimerization activity; HMG box domain binding; transcription factor binding; histone deacetylase binding; metal ion binding; transcription factor activity, RNA polymerase II core promoter proximal region sequence-specific binding; bHLH transcription factor binding; protein C-terminus binding; protein binding; histone acetyltransferase binding; nucleic acid binding; sequence-specific DNA binding; RNA polymerase II transcription regulatory region sequence-specific DNA binding; DNA binding; double-stranded DNA binding; DNA-binding transcription activator activity, RNA polymerase II-specific; DNA-binding transcription factor activity; RNA polymerase II cis-regulatory region sequence-specific DNA binding; core promoter sequence-specific DNA binding; DNA-binding transcription factor activity, RNA polymerase II-specific; cis-regulatory region sequence-specific DNA binding
Cellular component	cytoplasm; nucleoplasm; protein-DNA complex; nucleus; transcription repressor complex
Biological process	positive regulation of hydrogen sulfide biosynthetic process; rhythmic process; regulation of transcription by RNA polymerase II; positive regulation of transcription, DNA-templated; viral process; regulation of transcription, DNA-templated; transcription, DNA-templated; snRNA transcription by RNA polymerase II; cellular response to insulin stimulus; positive regulation of transcription by RNA polymerase II; regulation of cholesterol biosynthetic process; positive regulation of gene expression; positive regulation of blood vessel endothelial cell migration; positive regulation of angiogenesis; positive regulation of vascular endothelial cell proliferation; response to hydroperoxide
Sources:Amigo / QuickGO
Orthologs
Databases	NCBI: entry; OMA: entry
Species	Human	Mouse
Entrez	6667	20683
Ensembl	ENSG00000185591	ENSMUSG00000001280
UniProt	P08047	O89090
RefSeq (mRNA)	NM_001251825; NM_003109; NM_138473	NM_013672
RefSeq (protein)	NP_001238754; NP_003100; NP_612482	NP_038700
Location (UCSC)	Chr 12: 53.38 – 53.42 Mb	Chr 15: 102.31 – 102.34 Mb
PubMed search
- Wikidata
View/Edit Human	View/Edit Mouse

Transcription factor Sp1, also known as specificity protein 1* is a protein that in humans is encoded by the SP1 gene.

== Function ==
The protein encoded by this gene is a zinc finger transcription factor that binds to GC-rich motifs of many promoters. The encoded protein is involved in many cellular processes, including cell differentiation, cell growth, apoptosis, immune responses, response to DNA damage, and chromatin remodeling. post-translational modifications such as phosphorylation, acetylation, O-GlcNAcylation, and proteolytic processing significantly affect the activity of this protein, which can be an activator or a repressor.

In the SV40 virus, Sp1 binds to the GC boxes in the regulatory sequence of the genome.

== Structure ==
SP1 belongs to the Sp/KLF family of transcription factors. The protein is 785 amino acids long, with a molecular weight of 81 kDa. The SP1 transcription factor contains two glutamine-rich activation domains at its N-terminus that are believed to be necessary for promoter trans-activation. SP1 most notably contains three zinc finger protein motifs at its C-terminus, by which it binds directly to DNA and allows for interaction of the protein with other transcriptional regulators. Its zinc fingers are of the Cys_{2}/His_{2} type and bind the consensus sequence 5'-(G/T)GGGCGG(G/A)(G/A)(C/T)-3' (GC box element). Some 12,000 SP-1 binding sites are found in the human genome.

== Applications ==
Sp1 has been used as a control protein to compare with when studying the increase or decrease of the aryl hydrocarbon receptor and/or the estrogen receptor, since it binds to both and generally remains at a relatively constant level.

Recently, a putative promoter region in FTMT, and positive regulators {SP1, cAMP response element-binding protein (CREB), and Ying Yang 1 (YY1)] and negative regulators [GATA2, forkhead box protein A1 (FoxA1), and CCAAT enhancer-binding protein b (C/EBPb)] of FTMT transcription have been identified (Guaraldo et al, 2016).The effect of DFP on the DNA-binding activity of these regulators to the FTMT promoter was examined using chromatin immunoprecipitation (ChIP) assay. Among the regulators, only SP1 displayed significantly increased DNA- binding activity following DFP treatment in a dose-dependent manner. SP1 knockdown by siRNA abolished the DFP-induced increase in the mRNA levels of FTMT, indicating SP1-mediated regulation of FTMT expression in the presence of DFP. Treatment with Deferiprone increased the expression of cytoplasmic and nuclear SP1 with predominant localization in the nucleus.

== Inhibitors ==
Plicamycin, an antineoplastic antibiotic produced by Streptomyces plicatus, and Withaferin A, a steroidal lactone from Withania somnifera plant are known to inhibit Sp1 transcription factor.

miR-375-5p microRNA significantly decreased expression of SP1 and YAP1 in colorectal cancer cells. SP1 and YAP1 mRNAs are direct targets of miR-375-5p.

== Interactions ==
Transcription factor Sp1 has been shown to interact with:

- AATF,
- CEBPB,
- COL1A1,
- E2F1,
- FOSL1,
- GABPA,
- HDAC1,
- HDAC2,
- HMGA1,
- HCFC1,
- HTT,
- KLF6,
- MEF2C,
- MEF2D,
- MSX1,
- Myogenin,
- POU2F1,
- PPP1R13L,
- PSMC5,
- PML,
- RELA,
- SMAD3,
- SUMO1,
- SF1,
- TAL1,
- UBC.
- WRN,
- DDX3X
