= Compost bedded pack barn =

Type of housing for dairy cattle

A compost bedded pack barn (CBP) is a type of housing for dairy cattle. It is a loose housing system, similar to free-stall housing, except there are no stalls or partitions.

In a CBP, the resting and exercise areas of the cows are combined, resulting in reduced ammonia emissions, lower building costs, and increased cow movement. For these systems to be successful, they must be managed very closely. They require tilling with a roto-tiller or deep-tillage tool to incorporate the manure, urine, and air into the pack and allow it to dry. The composting process allows the manure and urine to be stored for months at a time, while also supplying a bedding and exercise area for cows.

Compost bedded pack barns are a fairly new system for housing dairy cattle, and are appealing to producers due to the lower instances of lameness and hock lesions. They also improve cow comfort, as the cows are not restricted in their lying behavior from stall size and partitions that are typically found in free-stall housing systems.

Compost bedded pack barns are typically bedded with wood shavings/sawdust, or other organic materials that are compostable.

For the composting process to work in a CBP, the internal temperature of the pack must be maintained at approximately 43.3–65.0 °C (109.9–149.0 °F) and have a moisture content at approximately 40–60%. The lower end of the temperature range is compatible with cellulose degradation, which is needed to break down the wood shavings/sawdust that is typically used. The higher end of the temperature range is compatible with pathogen destruction, which helps destroy mastitis-causing bacteria.

The first CBP in the US was built in 2001 in Minnesota. However, the compost bedded pack system was invented by dairy farmers in Virginia to improve upon the conventional bedded pack system.

The recommended stocking density of a CBP is 7.4 m^{2}/cow (80 sq. feet/cow) for the average Holstein cow. This allows for the proper aeration and absorption of manure and urine by the bedding and still allow the composting process to work.
