= CTBP2 =

Protein-coding gene in the species Homo sapiens

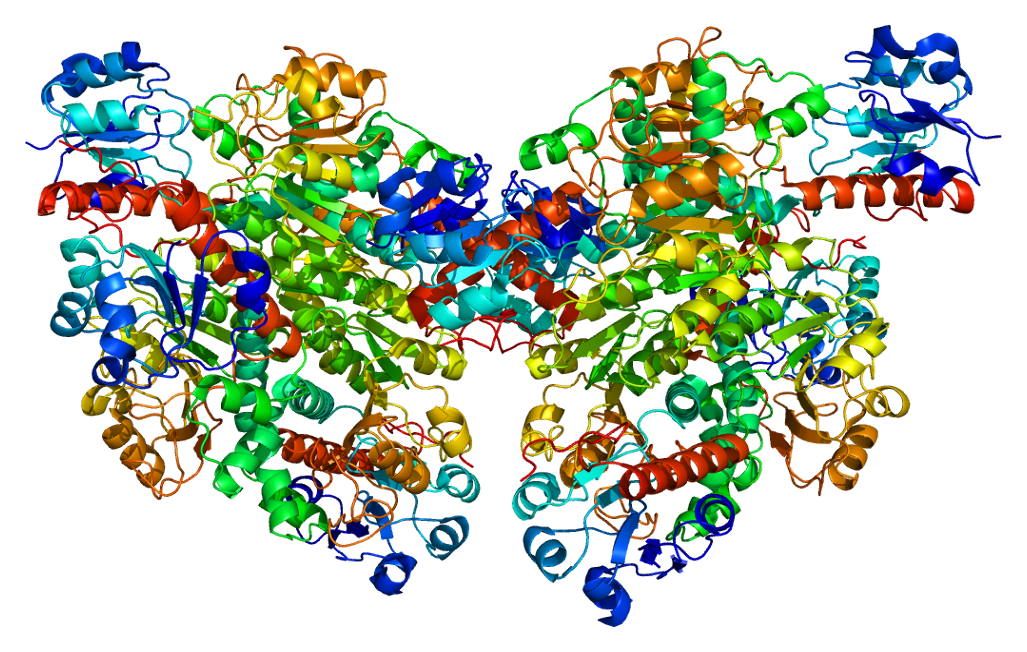
Available structures
PDB	Ortholog search: PDBe RCSB
PDB	List of PDB id codes 2OME, 4LCJ

Identifiers
- Aliases: CTBP2, C-terminal binding protein 2
- External IDs: OMIM: 602619; MGI: 1201686; HomoloGene: 75187; GeneCards: CTBP2; OMA:CTBP2 - orthologs

Gene location (Human)
Chr.	Chromosome 10 (human)
Band	10q26.13	Start	124,984,317 bp
Band	10q26.13	End	125,161,170 bp

Gene location (Mouse)
Chr.	Chromosome 7 (mouse)
Band	7 F3|7 76.32 cM	Start	132,987,563 bp
Band	7 F3|7 76.32 cM	End	133,124,354 bp
RNA expression pattern
Bgee	Human / Mouse (ortholog); Top expressed in: pancreatic ductal cell; buccal mucosa cell; mucosa of paranasal sinus; pylorus; cardia; retinal pigment epithelium; renal medulla; dorsal motor nucleus of vagus nerve; nasal epithelium; caput epididymis / Top expressed in: saccule; otic placode; otic vesicle; migratory enteric neural crest cell; abdominal wall; retina; epiblast; Gonadal ridge; neural layer of retina; vas deferens; More reference expression data
BioGPS	n/a
Gene ontology
Molecular function	oxidoreductase activity, acting on the CH-OH group of donors, NAD or NADP as acceptor; NAD binding; protein binding; oxidoreductase activity; hydroxypyruvate reductase activity; protein kinase binding; glyoxylate reductase (NADP+) activity; protein homodimerization activity; protein-containing complex binding; transcription corepressor activity; chromatin binding; transcription coactivator activity; retinoic acid receptor binding; structural constituent of presynaptic active zone
Cellular component	synapse; cell junction; nucleus; cytosol; transcription repressor complex; ribbon synapse; presynaptic active zone cytoplasmic component; glutamatergic synapse; GABA-ergic synapse; presynaptic cytosol; photoreceptor ribbon synapse
Biological process	cell differentiation; regulation of transcription, DNA-templated; viral genome replication; transcription, DNA-templated; metabolism; viral process; negative regulation of cell population proliferation; negative regulation of transcription, DNA-templated; positive regulation of transcription by RNA polymerase II; positive regulation of retinoic acid receptor signaling pathway; white fat cell differentiation; positive regulation of chromatin binding; cellular response to leukemia inhibitory factor; synaptic vesicle docking; maintenance of presynaptic active zone structure
Sources:Amigo / QuickGO
Orthologs
Species	Human	Mouse
Entrez	1488	13017
Ensembl	ENSG00000175029	ENSMUSG00000030970
UniProt	P56545	P56546
RefSeq (mRNA)	NM_001083914; NM_001290214; NM_001290215; NM_001329; NM_022802 NM_001321012; NM_001321013; NM_001321014; NM_001363508	NM_001170744; NM_009980; NM_001347623
RefSeq (protein)	NP_001077383; NP_001277143; NP_001277144; NP_001307941; NP_001307942 NP_001307943; NP_001320; NP_073713; NP_001350437	NP_001164215; NP_001334552; NP_034110
Location (UCSC)	Chr 10: 124.98 – 125.16 Mb	Chr 7: 132.99 – 133.12 Mb
PubMed search
- Wikidata
View/Edit Human	View/Edit Mouse

C-terminal-binding protein 2 also known as CtBP2 is a protein that in humans is encoded by the CTBP2 gene.

== Function ==
The CtBPs - CtBP1 and CtBP2 in mammals - are among the best characterized transcriptional corepressors. They typically turn their target genes off. They do this by binding to sequence-specific DNA-binding proteins that carry a short motif of the general form Proline-Isoleucine-Aspartate-Leucine-Serine (the PIDLS motif). They then recruit histone modifying enzymes, histone deacetylases, histone methylases and histone demethylases. These enzymes are thought to work together to remove activating and add repressive histone marks. For example, histone deacetylase 1 (HDAC1) and HDAC2 can remove the activating mark histone 3 acetyl lysine 9 (H3K9Ac), then the histone methylase G9a can add methyl groups, while the histone demethylase lysine specific demethylase 1 (LSD1) can remove the activating mark H3K4me.

The CtBPs bind to many different DNA-binding proteins and also bind to co-repressors that are themselves bound to DNA-binding proteins, such as Friend of GATA (Fog). CtBPs can also dimerize and multimerize to bridge larger transcriptional complexes. They appear to be primarily scaffold proteins that allow the assembly of gene repression complexes.

One interesting aspect of CtBPs is their ability to bind to NADH and to a lesser extent NAD^{+}. It has been proposed that this will enable them to sense the metabolic status of the cell and to regulate genes in response to changes in the NADH/NAD^{+} ratio. Accordingly, CtBPs have been found to be important in fat biology, binding to key proteins such as PRDM16, NRIP, and FOG2.

The full functional roles of CtBP proteins in mammals have been difficult to evaluate because of partial redundancy between CtBP1 and CtBP2. Similarly, the early lethality of the CtBP2 knockout and of double knockout mice has precluded detailed analysis of the cellular effects of deleting these proteins. Important results have emerged from model organisms where there is only a single CtBP gene. In Drosophila CtBP is involved in development and in circadian rhythms. In the worm C. elegans CtBP is involved in life span. Both circadian rhythms and life span appear to be linked to metabolism supporting the role for CtBPs in metabolic sensing.

The mammalian CtBP2 gene produces alternative transcripts encoding two distinct proteins. In addition to the transcriptional repressor (corepressor) discussed above, there is a longer isoform that is a major component of specialized synapses known as synaptic ribbons. Both proteins contain a NAD^{+} binding domain similar to NAD^{+}-dependent 2-hydroxyacid dehydrogenases. A portion of the 3'-untranslated region was used to map this gene to chromosome 21q21.3; however, it was noted that similar loci elsewhere in the genome are likely. Blast analysis shows that this gene is present on chromosome 10.

== Alternative Promoter Usage ==
In the vertebrate retina, the CtBP2 gene is transcribed from alternative promoters during retinal development yielding the CTBP2 transcriptional coregulator as well as the larger ribbon synapse scaffolding protein RIBEYE. The multi use functionality of the CtBP2 locus appears to be conserved between avian and primate retinae with production of the RIBEYE mRNA being developmentally delayed by an epigenetic silencing mechanism. In the developing human retina, transcription of the RIBEYE mRNA isoform is epigenetically regulated by DNA methylation. DNA sequences comprising the proximal RIBEYE promoter are enriched for DNA methylation and delay transcription of this isoform, possibly by inhibiting binding of the Cone-rod homeobox (CRX) transcription factor. Global transcript analysis of human pluripotent stem cell (hPSC)-derived 3D retinal organoids demonstrates early and persistent expression of the CTPB2 isoform followed by delayed RIBEYE expression in the developing human eye.

== Interactions ==
CTBP2 has been shown to interact with:

- FHL3,
- KLF3,
- KLF8,
- Mdm2,
- NRIP1,
- SOX6, and
- ZFPM2.
