= KLF17 =

Protein-coding gene in humans

Identifiers
- Aliases: KLF17, ZNF393, Zfp393, Kruppel-like factor 17, Kruppel like factor 17, ZLF393
- External IDs: OMIM: 609602; MGI: 2181068; GeneCards: KLF17

Gene location (Human)
Chr.	Chromosome 1 (human)
Band	1p34.1	Start	44,118,821 bp
Band	1p34.1	End	44,135,140 bp

Gene location (Mouse)
Chr.	Chromosome 4 (mouse)
Band	4 D1|4 53.46 cM	Start	117,615,033 bp
Band	4 D1|4 53.46 cM	End	117,622,845 bp
RNA expression pattern
Bgee	Human / Mouse (ortholog); Top expressed in: left testis; testicle; right testis; smooth muscle tissue; gonad; sperm; stromal cell of endometrium; right lung; left adrenal gland; right adrenal gland / Top expressed in: zygote; secondary oocyte; primary oocyte; spermatid; embryo; urethra; male urethra; lumbar subsegment of spinal cord; morula; morula; More reference expression data
BioGPS	n/a
Gene ontology
Molecular function	DNA binding; protein binding; metal ion binding; nucleic acid binding; DNA-binding transcription factor activity; DNA-binding transcription factor activity, RNA polymerase II-specific; DNA-binding transcription repressor activity, RNA polymerase II-specific
Cellular component	nucleus
Biological process	regulation of transcription, DNA-templated; transcription, DNA-templated; regulation of transcription by RNA polymerase II; negative regulation of transcription by RNA polymerase II
Sources:Amigo / QuickGO
Orthologs
Databases	NCBI: entry; OMA: entry
Species	Human	Mouse
Entrez	128209	75753
Ensembl	ENSG00000171872	ENSMUSG00000048626
UniProt	Q5JT82	Q8CFA7
RefSeq (mRNA)	NM_173484	NM_029416
RefSeq (protein)	NP_775755	NP_083692
Location (UCSC)	Chr 1: 44.12 – 44.14 Mb	Chr 4: 117.62 – 117.62 Mb
PubMed search
- Wikidata
View/Edit Human	View/Edit Mouse

Krueppel-like factor 17 is a protein that in humans is encoded by the KLF17 gene.
