= KLF1 =

Protein-coding gene in the species Homo sapiens

Identifiers
- Aliases: KLF1, CDAN4, EKLF, HBFQTL6, INLU, Kruppel-like factor 1 (erythroid), Kruppel like factor 1, EKLF/KLF1
- External IDs: OMIM: 600599; MGI: 1342771; GeneCards: KLF1
Available structures
| PDB | Ortholog search: PDBe RCSB |
| PDB | List of PDB id codes 2L2I, 2MBH, 2N23 |

Gene location (Human)
| Chr. | Chromosome 19 (human) |
| Band | 19p13.13 | Start | 12,884,422 bp |
| Band | 19p13.13 | End | 12,887,201 bp |

Gene location (Mouse)
| Chr. | Chromosome 8 (mouse) |
| Band | 8 41.3 cM|8 C3 | Start | 85,628,557 bp |
| Band | 8 41.3 cM|8 C3 | End | 85,631,924 bp |
RNA expression pattern
| Bgee | Human / Mouse (ortholog); Top expressed in: trabecular bone; bone marrow; blood; bone marrow cell; monocyte; tibialis anterior muscle; granulocyte; ventricular zone; gonad; spleen / Top expressed in: fetal liver hematopoietic progenitor cell; tibiofemoral joint; human fetus; spleen; embryo; body of femur; bone marrow; abdominal wall; urethra; female urethra; More reference expression data |
| BioGPS | n/a |
Gene ontology
| Molecular function | DNA-binding transcription factor activity; DNA binding; cis-regulatory region sequence-specific DNA binding; metal ion binding; nucleic acid binding; protein binding; DNA-binding transcription factor activity, RNA polymerase II-specific; RNA polymerase II cis-regulatory region sequence-specific DNA binding; DNA-binding transcription activator activity, RNA polymerase II-specific |
| Cellular component | nucleus; nucleoplasm |
| Biological process | positive regulation of transcription, DNA-templated; erythrocyte differentiation; cellular response to peptide; regulation of transcription, DNA-templated; transcription, DNA-templated; maternal process involved in female pregnancy; regulation of transcription by RNA polymerase II; positive regulation of transcription by RNA polymerase II |
Sources:Amigo / QuickGO
Orthologs
| Databases | NCBI: entry; OMA: entry |
| Species | Human | Mouse |
| Entrez | 10661 | 16596 |
| Ensembl | ENSG00000105610 | ENSMUSG00000054191 |
| UniProt | Q13351 | P46099 |
| RefSeq (mRNA) | NM_006563 | NM_010635 |
| RefSeq (protein) | NP_006554 | NP_034765 |
| Location (UCSC) | Chr 19: 12.88 – 12.89 Mb | Chr 8: 85.63 – 85.63 Mb |
| PubMed search |
- Wikidata
| View/Edit Human | View/Edit Mouse |

Krueppel-like factor 1 is a protein that in humans is encoded by the KLF1 gene. The gene for KLF1 is on the human chromosome 19 and on mouse chromosome 8. Krueppel-like factor 1 is a transcription factor that is necessary for the proper maturation of erythroid (red blood) cells.

== Structure ==
The molecule has two domains; the transactivation domain and the chromatin-remodeling domain. The carboxyl (C) terminal is composed of three C2H2 zinc fingers that binds to DNA, and the amino (N) terminus is proline rich and acidic.

== Function ==
Studies in mice first demonstrated the critical function of KLF1 in hematopoietic development. KLF1 deficient (knockout) mouse embryos exhibit a lethal anemic phenotype, fail to promote the transcription of adult β-globin, and die by embryonic day 15. Over-expression of KLF1 results in a reduction of the number of circulating platelets and hastens the onset of the β-globin gene.

KLF1 coordinates the regulation of six cellular pathways that are all essential to terminal erythroid differentiation:

1. Cell Membrane & Cytoskeleton
2. Apoptosis
3. Heme Synthesis & Transport
4. Cell Cycling
5. Iron Procurement
6. Globin Chain Production

It has also been linked to three main processes that are all essential to transcription of the β globin gene:

1. Chromatin remodeling
2. Modulation of the gamma to beta globin switch
3. Transcriptional activation

KLF1 binds specifically to the "CACCC" motif of the β-globin gene promoter. When natural mutations occur in the promoter, β+ thalassemia can arise in humans. Thalassemia's prevalence (2 million worldwide carry the trait) makes KLF1 clinically significant.

== Clinical significance ==
Next-Generation sequencing efforts have revealed a surprisingly high prevalence of mutations in human KLF1. The chance of a KLF1 null child being conceived is approximately 1:24,000 in Southern China. With pre-natal blood transfusions and bone marrow transplant, it is possible to be born without KLF1. Most mutations in KLF1 lead to a recessive loss-of-function phenotype, however semi-dominant mutations have been identified in humans and mice as the cause of a rare inherited anemia CDA type IV. Additional family studies and clinical research unveiled the molecular genetics of the HPFH KLF1-related condition and established KLF1 as a novel quantitative trait locus for HbF (HBFQTL6). Permissive nature of the role of KLF1 on expression of several RBC antigens are evidenced by a series of known KLF1 mutations which are named after its modifier gene effect on Lutheral blood group In(Lu) ie "Inhibitor of Lutheran". No homozygouse alive human examples are known, corroborating with the Embryonic lethality of KLF1 homozygous mice. So the In(Lu) mutatants are significantly heteroinsuffient for KLF1 function such that RBC are formed, but there is an apparent dominant negative effect on expression of Lutheran Antigen (Basal cell adhesion Molecule) after which it was named, but also significant but somewhat variable degree of inhibition of expression of Colton (Aquaporin1), Ok (CD147 ie EMMPRIN), Indian(CD44), Duffy (Duffy antigen/chemokine receptor or Fy), Scianna (ERMAP), MN (glycophorin A), Diego(band 3), P1, i, AnWj (CD44) etc. Antigens on RBC membrane, and some of which might overlap with KLF1 mutations causing the fraction of hereditary persistence of fetal hemoglobin with CDA type IV.
