= KLF8 =

Protein-coding gene in the species Homo sapiens

Identifiers
- Aliases: KLF8, BKLF3, ZNF741, Kruppel-like factor 8, Kruppel like factor 8
- External IDs: OMIM: 300286; MGI: 2442430; GeneCards: KLF8

Gene location (Human)
Chr.	X chromosome (human)
Band	Xp11.21	Start	56,232,356 bp
Band	Xp11.21	End	56,291,531 bp

Gene location (Mouse)
Chr.	X chromosome (mouse)
Band	X|X F3	Start	152,020,462 bp
Band	X|X F3	End	152,179,128 bp
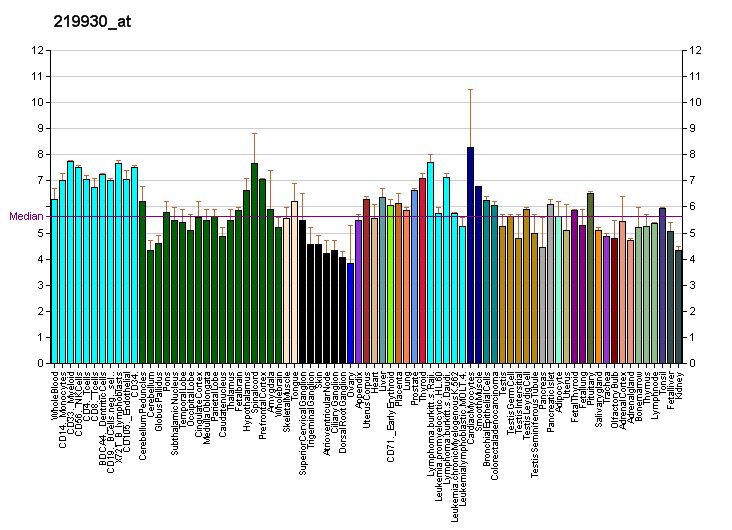
RNA expression pattern
Bgee	Human / Mouse (ortholog); Top expressed in: skin of abdomen; oral cavity; skin of leg; vagina; skin of thigh; popliteal artery; tibial arteries; skin of hip; parietal pleura; gingival epithelium / Top expressed in: placenta; morula; ganglionic eminence; epiblast; blastocyst; embryo; granulocyte; yolk sac; mesencephalon; ventricular zone; More reference expression data
BioGPS	More reference expression data
Gene ontology
Molecular function	DNA binding; metal ion binding; nucleic acid binding; RNA polymerase II cis-regulatory region sequence-specific DNA binding; DNA-binding transcription repressor activity, RNA polymerase II-specific; DNA-binding transcription factor activity, RNA polymerase II-specific
Cellular component	nucleus; nucleoplasm; cytosol; aggresome
Biological process	regulation of transcription, DNA-templated; transcription, DNA-templated; negative regulation of transcription by RNA polymerase II; regulation of transcription by RNA polymerase II
Sources:Amigo / QuickGO
Orthologs
Databases	NCBI: entry; OMA: entry
Species	Human	Mouse
Entrez	11279	245671
Ensembl	ENSG00000102349	ENSMUSG00000041649
UniProt	O95600	Q8BLM0
RefSeq (mRNA)	NM_001159296; NM_007250; NM_001324099; NM_001324100; NM_001324102 NM_001324104; NM_001324105	NM_173780; NM_001357183
RefSeq (protein)	NP_001152768; NP_001311028; NP_001311029; NP_001311031; NP_001311033 NP_001311034; NP_009181	NP_776141; NP_001344112
Location (UCSC)	Chr X: 56.23 – 56.29 Mb	Chr X: 152.02 – 152.18 Mb
PubMed search
- Wikidata
View/Edit Human	View/Edit Mouse

Krueppel-like factor 8 is a protein that in humans is encoded by the KLF8 gene. KLF8 belongs to the family of KLF protein. KLF8 is activated by KLF1 along with KLF3 while KLF3 represses KLF8.

== Interactions ==
KLF8 has been shown to interact with CTBP2.
