= Transactivation domain =

Transcription factor scaffold domain

The transactivation domain or trans-activating domain (TAD) is a transcription factor scaffold domain which contains binding sites for other proteins such as transcription coregulators. These binding sites are frequently referred to as activation functions (AFs). TADs are named after their amino acid composition. These amino acids are either essential for the activity or simply the most abundant in the TAD. Transactivation by the Gal4 transcription factor is mediated by acidic amino acids, whereas hydrophobic residues in Gcn4 play a similar role. Hence, the TADs in Gal4 and Gcn4 are referred to as acidic or hydrophobic, respectively.

In general we can distinguish four classes of TADs:

- acidic domains (called also "acid blobs" or "negative noodles", rich in D and E amino acids, present in Gal4, Gcn4 and VP16).
- glutamine-rich domains (contains multiple repetitions like "QQQXXXQQQ", present in SP1)
- proline-rich domains (contains repetitions like "PPPXXXPPP" present in c-jun, AP2 and Oct-2)
- isoleucine-rich domains (repetitions "IIXXII", present in NTF-1)

Alternatively, since similar amino acid compositions does not necessarily mean similar activation pathways, TADs can be grouped by the process they stimulate, either initiation or elongation.

== Acidic/9aaTAD ==
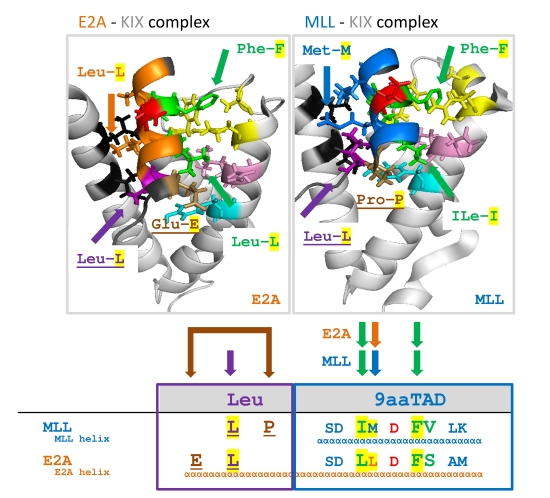
9aaTAD-KIX domain complexes

Nine-amino-acid transactivation domain (9aaTAD) defines a domain common to a large superfamily of eukaryotic transcription factors represented by Gal4, Oaf1, Leu3, Rtg3, Pho4, Gln3, Gcn4 in yeast, and by p53, NFAT, NF-κB and VP16 in mammals. The definition largely overlaps with an "acidic" family definition. A 9aaTAD prediction tool is available. 9aaTADs tend to have an associated 3-aa hydrophobic (usually Leu-rich) region immediately to its N-terminal.

9aaTAD transcription factors p53, VP16, MLL, E2A, HSF1, NF-IL6, NFAT1 and NF-κB interact directly with the general coactivators TAF9 and CBP/p300. p53 9aaTADs interact with TAF9, GCN5 and with multiple domains of CBP/p300 (KIX, TAZ1, TAZ2 and IBiD).

The KIX domain of general coactivators Med15(Gal11) interacts with 9aaTAD transcription factors Gal4, Pdr1, Oaf1, Gcn4, VP16, Pho4, Msn2, Ino2 and P201. Positions 1, 3-4, and 7 of the 9aaTAD are the main residues that interact with KIX. Interactions of Gal4, Pdr1 and Gcn4 with Taf9 have been observed. 9aaTAD is a common transactivation domain which recruits multiple general coactivators TAF9, MED15, CBP/p300 and GCN5.

Example 9aaTADs and KIX interactions
Source	9aaTAD	Peptide-KIX interaction (NMR)
p53 TAD1	E TFSD LWKL	LSPEETFSDLWKLPE
p53 TAD2	D DIEQ WFTE	QAMDDLMLSPDDIEQWFTEDPGPD
MLL	S DIMD FVLK	DCGNILPSDIMDFVLKNTP
E2A	D LLDF SMMF	PVGTDKELSDLLDFSMMFPLPVT
Rtg3	E TLDF SLVT	E2A homolog
CREB	R KILN DLSS	RREILSRRPSYRKILNDLSSDAP
CREBaB6	E AILA ELKK	CREB-mutant binding to KIX
Gli3	D DVVQ YLNS	TAD homology to CREB/KIX
Gal4	D DVYN YLFD	Pdr1 and Oaf1 homolog
Oaf1	D LFDY DFLV	DLFDYDFLV
Pip2	D FFDY DLLF	Oafl homolog
Pdr1	E DLYS ILWS	EDLYSILWSDWY
Pdr3	T DLYH TLWN	Pdr1 homolog

== Glutamine-rich ==
Glutamine (Q)-rich TADs are found in POU2F1 (Oct1), POU2F2 (Oct2), and Sp1 (see also Sp/KLF family). Although such is not the case for every Q-rich TAD, Sp1 is shown to interact with TAF4 (TAFII 130), a part of the TFIID assembly.

== See also ==
- DNA-binding protein
- Transcription factor
