= Norbert Perrimon =

French-American geneticist

- Born: October 24, 1958 (age 68); Bosguérard-de-Marcouville
- Citizenship: France, United States
- Education: University of Paris
- Known for: GAL4/UAS system
- Awards: George W. Beadle Award (2004)
- Scientific career
- Workplaces: Harvard Medical School; Howard Hughes Medical Institute; Case Western Reserve University
- Thesis: Analyse Clonale de Mutations en Lignee Germinale chez la Drosophile (1983)
- Academic advisors: Madeleine Gans
- Notable students: Sara Cherry
- Website: perrimon.med.harvard.edu; www.hhmi.org/scientists/norbert-perrimon; fgr.hms.harvard.edu/home

Norbert Perrimon is a French geneticist and developmental biologist. He is the James Stillman Professor of Developmental Biology in the Department of Genetics at Harvard Medical School, an Investigator at the Howard Hughes Medical Institute, and an Associate of the Broad Institute. He is known for developing a number of techniques used in genetic research with Drosophila melanogaster, as well as specific substantive contributions to signal transduction, developmental biology and physiology.

Perrimon has authored over 400 peer-reviewed publications, with an H-index exceeding 150.

== Education ==
Perrimon was born in 1958 in Bosguérard-de-Marcouville, France. He earned his undergraduate degree (Maitrise of Biochemistry) at the University of Paris VI, in 1981, then completed his doctorate in 1983 with Madeleine Gans, also at the University of Paris.

== Career ==
From 1983 to 1986 Perrimon was a postdoctoral researcher with Anthony Mahowald at Case Western Reserve University, and in 1986 at the age of 27 he accepted an appointment as faculty at Harvard Medical School. He is currently the James Stillman Professor of Developmental Biology in the Department of Genetics at Harvard Medical School. He has been an Investigator of the Howard Hughes Medical Institute since 1986.

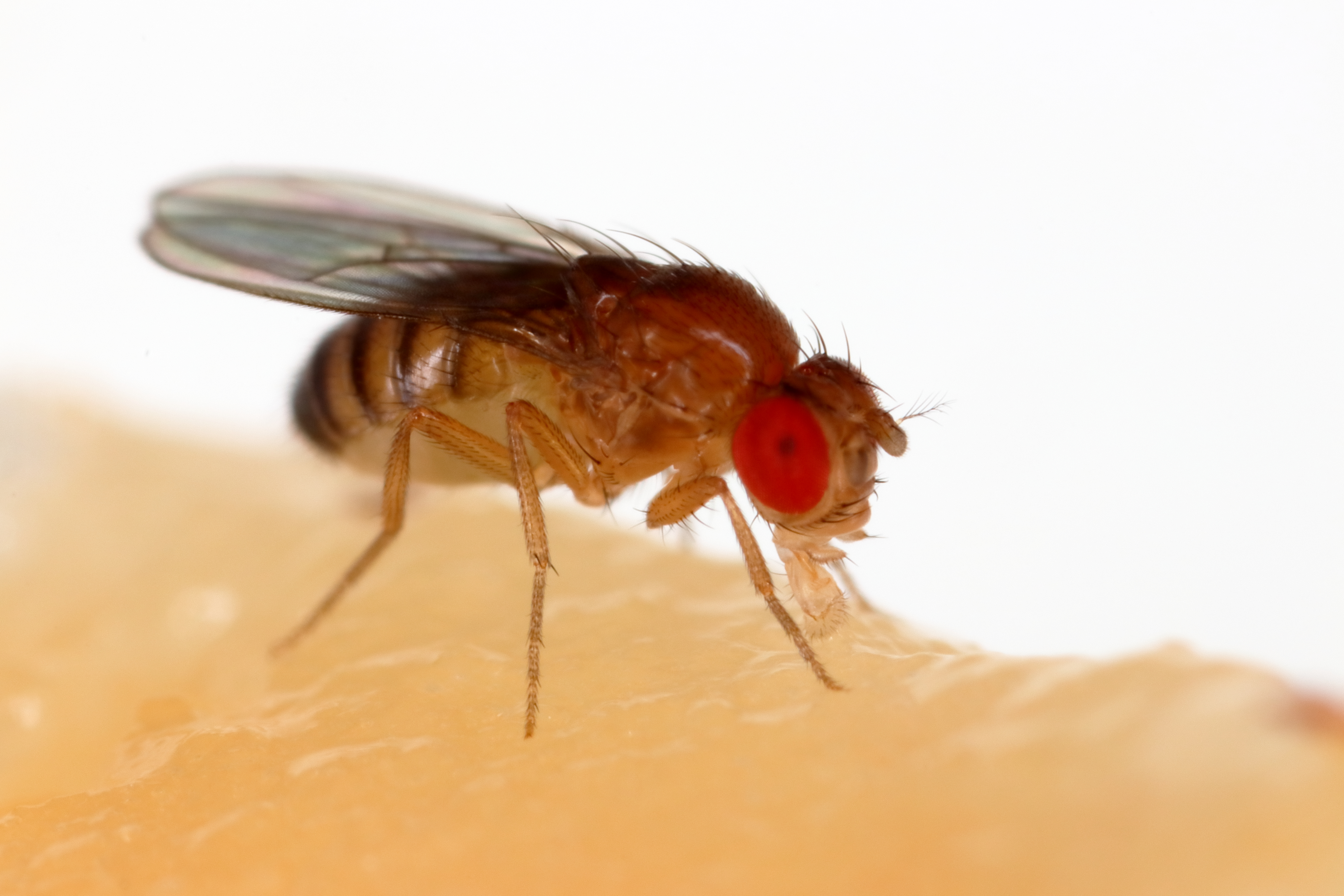
Drosophila Melanogaster, the object of Perrimon's science

== Research ==
=== Dominant Female Sterile Technique and Maternal-Effect Mutations ===
The FLP-FRT Dominant Female Sterile (DFS) technique was developed by Norbert Perrimon and Tze-bin Chou to produce germline mosaics in Drosophila melanogaster. The method enables gene manipulation in germline cells while leaving somatic cells unaffected. This technique addressed limitations in studying zygotic lethal mutations, which prevent organisms from surviving to adulthood. By generating mosaic germlines, researchers were able to examine the function of essential genes during early embryogenesis.

=== GAL4/UAS System ===
The GAL4/UAS system was introduced by Perrimon and Andrea Brand as a binary method for controlling gene expression in Drosophila. It employs the yeast transcription factor GAL4, which activates genes placed downstream of Upstream Activating Sequences (UAS).

By combining GAL4 drivers under tissue-specific or inducible promoters with UAS-linked transgenes, gene expression can be regulated spatially and temporally. Variants such as GAL80^{ts} and other binary systems (e.g., LexA/LexAop) have expanded its applicability.

=== Developmental Signaling Pathways ===
Using the DFS technique, genetic screens were conducted to identify maternal-effect genes involved in embryonic patterning. These studies contributed to the identification of components in several conserved signaling pathways, including Receptor Tyrosine Kinases (RTKs), JAK/STAT, Wnt/Wingless, JNK, Hedgehog, and Notch.

The work helped define mechanisms of cell signaling and pattern formation in early Drosophila development. Many of these pathways are evolutionarily conserved and play roles in tissue specification and morphogenesis.

=== Genome-Wide RNAi Screens ===
Genome-wide RNA interference (RNAi) screening was adapted for Drosophila cell lines in studies led by Perrimon. These high-throughput approaches allowed systematic analysis of gene function across a range of cellular processes, including signal transduction and host-pathogen interactions.

To support these efforts, the Drosophila RNAi Screening Center (DRSC) was established in 2003, followed by the Transgenic RNAi Project (TRiP) in 2008. The latter generated RNAi lines for in vivo gene knockdown using short hairpin RNA (shRNA) vectors. These resources have been used in studies of development and physiology.

=== Intestinal Stem Cells and Gut Homeostasis ===
In 2006, intestinal stem cells (ISCs) were identified in the adult Drosophila midgut by Perrimon and Craig Micchelli, in parallel with work from Alan Spradling's laboratory. This model system has been used to study stem cell maintenance, lineage specification, and tissue regeneration.

Subsequent research has examined how stem cell function is influenced by age, injury, diet, and microbiota. The system has also been used to study the regulation of tissue homeostasis and disease-related processes.

=== Inter-Organ Communication ===
Research in Drosophila has been used to study inter-organ communication, particularly how physiological signals coordinate growth and metabolism. Studies have identified secreted factors and pathways including insulin, TOR, and JAK/STAT that mediate signaling between tissues such as the fat body, gut, muscle, and brain.

This research has provided insight into how organisms regulate nutrient use and respond to environmental changes. Drosophila models have also been used to study conditions involving tissue wasting, such as cachexia.

=== Pooled CRISPR Screens in Arthropods ===
Pooled CRISPR/Cas9 screening methods were developed for Drosophila cell lines in collaboration between Perrimon and Ram Viswanatha. These techniques allow genome-wide functional analysis through high-throughput CRISPR-based editing.

This approach has been applied to study gene function in various biological contexts, including toxin susceptibility and host-pathogen interactions. The method has extended CRISPR screening capabilities to non-mammalian systems, including other arthropods.

== Awards and honors ==
Perrimon was elected to the United States National Academy of Sciences in April 2013, after naturalizing as an American citizen.

- Lucille P. Markey Scholar in Biomedical Sciences, 1985.
- Investigator, Howard Hughes Medical Institute, 1986–present
- Chaire d'Etat. College de France. Paris, 2003
- George W. Beadle Medal, Genetics Society of America, 2004
- RNAi Innovator Award, 2009
- Fellow of the American Academy of Arts and Sciences, 2008
- Fellow of the American Association for the Advancement of Science, 2009
- Associate member of the European Molecular Biology Organization (EMBO) 2011
- Fellow of the United States National Academy of Sciences, 2013
- The NIH Director's Transformative Research Award (2018)
- The Breakthroughs in Gerontology (BIG) Award from the Glenn Foundation for Medical Research (2019)
