= Berville =

Berville may refer to several communes in France:

- Berville, Val-d'Oise, in the Val-d'Oise département
- Berville-en-Roumois, in the Eure département
- Berville-la-Campagne, in the Eure département
- Berville-sur-Mer, in the Eure département
- Berville-en-Caux, in the Seine-Maritime département
- Berville-sur-Seine, in the Seine-Maritime département
