= Berville-sur-Mer =

- Commune
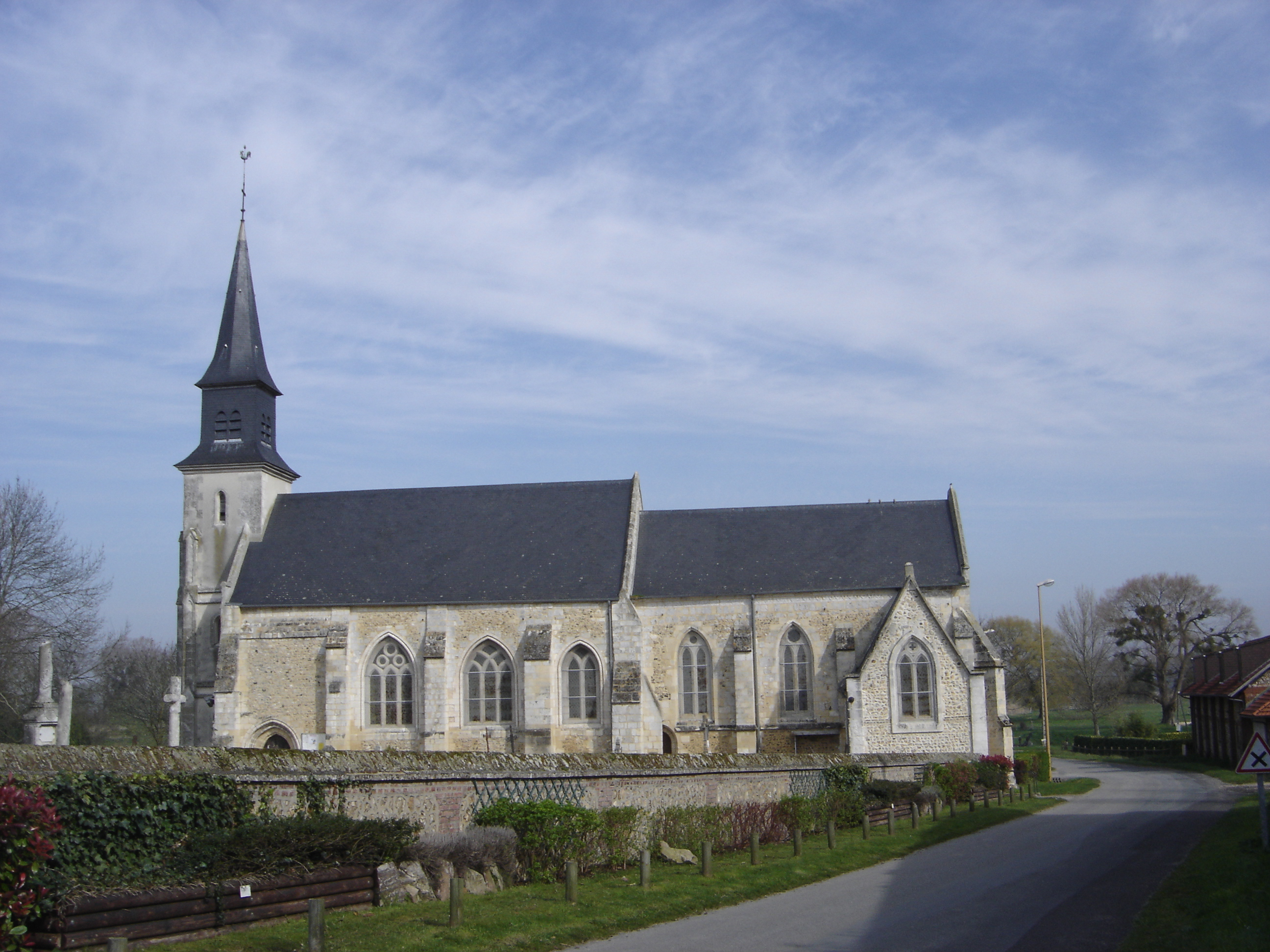
- The church in Berville-sur-Mer
- Location of Berville-sur-Mer
- Location within France Location within Normandy
- Coordinates: 49°25′55″N 0°21′44″E
- Country: France
- Region: Normandy
- Department: Eure
- Arrondissement: Bernay
- Canton: Beuzeville

Government
  - Mayor (2023–2026): Jacky Delile
- Area^{1}: 5.08 km^{2} (1.96 sq mi)
- Elevation: 27 m (89 ft)
- Highest elevation: 97 m (318 ft)
- Lowest elevation: 0 m (0 ft)
- Population (2023): 664
  - Density: 131/km^{2} (339/sq mi)
- Time zone: UTC+01:00 (CET)
  - Summer (DST): UTC+02:00 (CEST)
- INSEE/Postal code: 27064 /27210
- ^{1} French Land Register data, which excludes lakes, ponds, glaciers > 1 km^{2} (0.386 sq mi or 247 acres) and river estuaries.

Berville-sur-Mer is a commune in the Norman department of Eure in northern France.

The village is located on the banks of the Seine estuary, and was the crossing point of the river before the Pont de Normandie opened. It is the location of the longest barn in Normandy at 77 metres long. This has now been converted into holiday cottages which are mainly owned by Top Sun Ltd.

== Geography ==
Berville-sur-Mer ( "Berville on the sea") is a French commune located in the north-west of the Eure department in Normandy on the right bank (south) of the Seine estuary and have a small and uninhabited strip on the left bank.

Berville is part of natural region of Lieuvin and included in the Natural regional reserve of the Norman Seine loops (Parc naturel régional des Boucles de la Seine normande).

The village is 8.5 km east of Honfleur, 18.5 km south east of Le Havre and 55 km west of Rouen (as the crow flies).

The commune is crossed by the canal de Retour ("Return canal"), parallele to the Seine river. The Berville northeastern limit is marked by the Risle river confluence with the Seine.

== Population ==
The inhabitants are called Bervillais in French.

Historical population
Year	Pop.	±% p.a.
1968	417	—
1975	435	+0.61%
1982	502	+2.07%
1990	438	−1.69%
1999	431	−0.18%
2007	523	+2.45%
2012	634	+3.92%
2017	709	+2.26%
2023	664	−1.09%
Source: INSEE

== Toponymy ==
The name of the village is attested in a latinized final form of Bervilla in 1077 (Lisieux obituary), Bervilla super Secanam in 1234 (Jumièges cartulary)), Berville sur Seine in 1738, Saint-Mélaigne-de-Berville in 1868 (directory of the Norman association).

Composed in -ville with the old sense of "rural domain", preceded by the Germanic personal name Bero. It is a hypocoristic of the Germanic anthroponym Bern from * beran ("bear", in German "Bär").

The complementary determinant -sur-Mer is used to distinguish the municipality from the homonyms Berville-la-Campagne and Berville-en-Roumois in the same department of Eure, Berville-sur-Seine, further upstream and on the other bank in Seine-Maritime department, and other places in France called Berville.

On the sea ? Berville-sur-Mer is on the banks of the Seine estuary, well upstream of the Pont de Normandie (Normandy bridge). However, being located before the Risle and the Seine rivers confluence point, Berville was officially located by the sea, since a Napoleon I ordinance. However, within the meaning of the 1986 Loi du littoral (Coastal Law), Berville it is not part of the French coastal municipalities.

== See also ==
- Communes of the Eure department
