= Transcriptional activator LAG-3 =

Activator_LAG-3
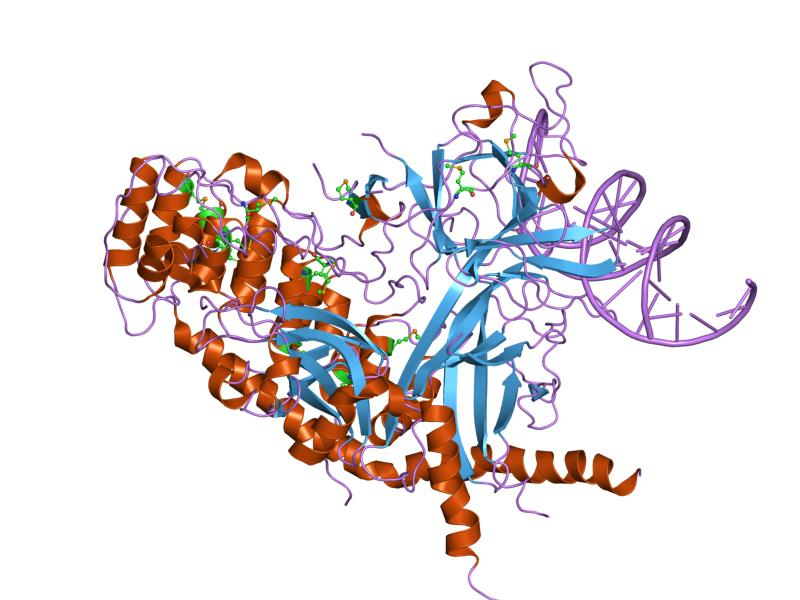
- crystal structure of the csl-notch-mastermind ternary complex bound to dna

Identifiers
- Symbol: Activator_LAG-3
- Pfam: PF11498
- InterPro: IPR021587
Available protein structures:
- PDB: IPR021587 PF11498 (ECOD; PDBsum)
- AlphaFold: IPR021587; PF11498

In molecular biology, the transcriptional activator LAG-3 is a transcriptional activator protein. The C. elegans Notch pathway, involved in the control of growth, differentiation and patterning in animal development, relies on either of the receptors GLP-1 or LIN-12. Both these receptors promote signalling by the recruitment of LAG-3 to target promoters, where it then acts as a transcriptional activator. LAG-3 works as a ternary complex together with the DNA binding protein, LAG-1.
