= KIX domain =

KIX (CBP)
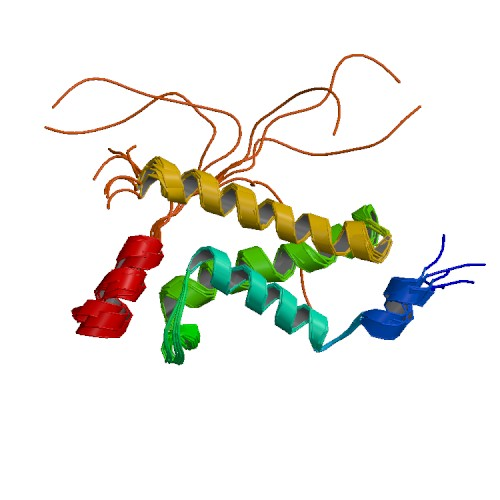
- Complex between the KIX domain of CBP (yellow, green and cyan) and the C-terminal transactivation domain of p65/RELA (red)

Identifiers
- Symbol: KIX
- Pfam: PF02172
- Pfam clan: CL0589
- InterPro: IPR003101
- CATH: 1sb0
- SCOP2: 1sb0 / SCOPe / SUPFAM
Available protein structures:
- PDB: IPR003101 PF02172 (ECOD; PDBsum)
- AlphaFold: IPR003101; PF02172

KIX (MED15)

Identifiers
- Symbol: KIX_2
- Pfam: PF16987
- InterPro: IPR036546
Available protein structures:
- PDB: IPR036546 PF16987 (ECOD; PDBsum)
- AlphaFold: IPR036546; PF16987

In biochemistry, the KIX domain (kinase-inducible domain (KID) interacting domain) or CREB binding domain is a protein domain of the eukaryotic transcriptional coactivators CBP and P300. It serves as a docking site for the formation of heterodimers between the coactivator and specific transcription factors. Structurally, the KIX domain is a globular domain consisting of three α-helices and two short 3_{10}-helices.

The KIX domain was originally discovered in 1996 as the specific and minimal region in CBP that binds and interacts with phosphorylated CREB to activate transcription. It was thus first termed CREB-binding domain. However, when it was later discovered that it also binds many other proteins, the more general name KIX domain became favoured. The KIX domain contains two separate binding sites: the "c-Myb site", named after the oncoprotein c-Myb, and the "MLL site", named after the proto-oncogene MLL (Mixed Lineage Leukemia, KMT2A).

The paralogous coactivators CBP (CREBBP) and P300 (EP300) are recruited to DNA-bound transcription factors to activate transcription. Coactivators can associate with promoters and enhancers in the DNA only indirectly through protein-protein contacts with transcription factors. CBP and P300 activate transcription synergistically in two ways: first, by remodelling and relaxing chromatin through their intrinsic histone acetyltransferase activity, and second, by recruiting the basal transcription machinery, such as RNA polymerase II.

The KIX domain belongs to the proposed GACKIX domain superfamily. GACKIX comprises structurally and functionally highly homologous domains in related proteins. It is named after the protein GAL11 / ARC105 (MED15), the plant protein CBP-like, and the KIX domain from CBP and P300. Additional instances include RECQL5 and related plant proteins. All of these contain a KIX domain or KIX-related domain that interacts with the transactivation domain of many different transcription factors. The distinction between a KIX domain, a KIX-related domain and a GACKIX domain is subject to an ongoing debate and not clearly defined.

== The full CBP/P300 protein ==
Overview of the structural domains of CBP

Aside from the KIX domain, CBP and P300 contain many other protein binding domains that should not be confused (numbers are aa numberings):

- CH1/TAZ1 domain, CBP[347–433], P300[323-423]
- KIX domain, CBP[587–666], P300[566–645]
- Bromodomain, CBP[1103–1175], P300[1067–1139]
- CH2 domain (IPR010303), CBP[1191–1317], P300[1155-1280].
- HAT domain, CBP[1323–1700], P300[1287–1663]
- CH3/ZZ domain, CBP[1701-1744], P300[1664-1707]
- CH3/TAZ2 domain, CBP[1765–1846], P300[1728-1809]
- IRF-3 binding (i-BiD), nuclear receptor coactivator binding (NCBD), or SRC1 interaction domain (SID; IPR014744), CBP[2020-2113], P300[1992-2098].

All three CH (cysteine/histidine-rich) domains are zinc fingers.

== Interactions ==
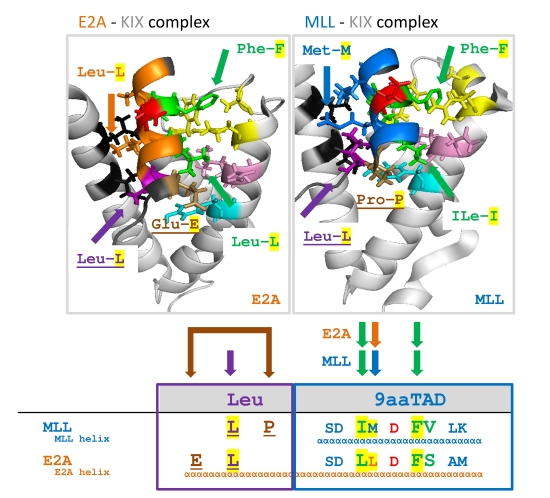
9aaTAD-KIX domain complexes

Human and animal proteins:

- ARNTL (BMAL1)
- ATF1
- ATF4 (CREB2)
- BRCA1
- CREB
- Cubitus interruptus (in D. melanogaster)
- ELK4 (SAP1)
- FOXO3 (FOXO3a)
- GLI3
- JUN (c-Jun)
- KMT2A (MLL)
- MYB (c-Myb)
- NFE2 (NF-E2 p45)
- RELA (NF-κB p65)
- SREBP
- STAT1
- TCF3 (E2A)
- TP53 (p53)
- YY1

Yeast proteins:

- Gal4p
- Gcn4
- Pdr1
- Pdr3
- Oaf1

Viral proteins:

- Regulatory protein E2 (from Human papillomavirus)
- Tat (from HIV-1)
- Tax (from Deltaretrovirus)
