= Pdr1p =

Transcription factor

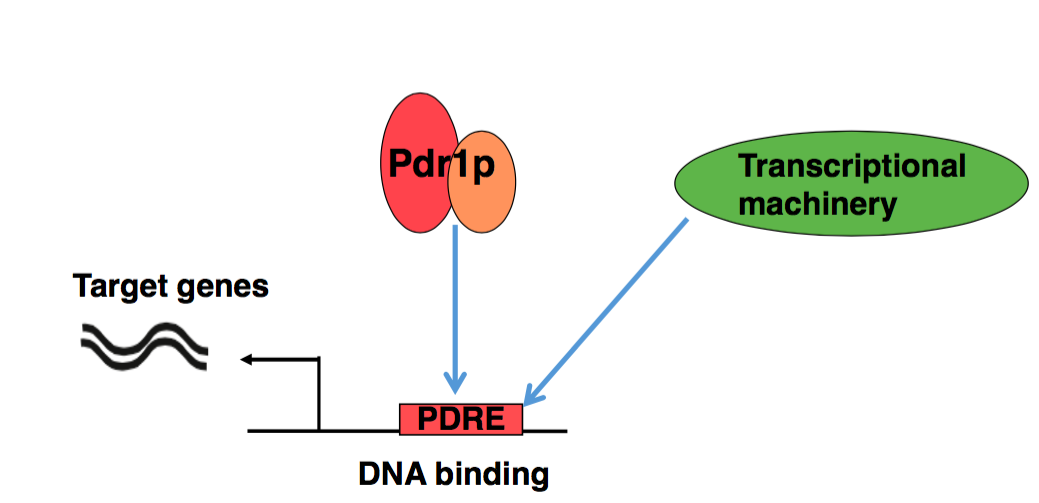
A Diagram of Pdr1p transcription. A Pdr1p dimer binds to PDRE and recruits transcriptional machineries necessary for transcription.

Pdr1p (Pleiotropic Drug Resistance 1p) is a transcription factor found in yeast and is a key regulator of genes involved in general drug response. It induces the expression of ATP-binding cassette transporter, which can export toxic substances out of the cell, allowing cells to survive under general toxic chemicals. It binds to DNA sequences that contain certain motifs called pleiotropic drug response element (PDRE). Pdr1p is encoded by a gene called PDR1 (also known as YGL013C) on chromosome VII.

== Transcriptional role ==
Motif Analysis of PDRE

Pdr1p is a main regulator of PDR genes and is known to target about 50 genes. Pdr1p binds to sequence 5'-TCCGYGGR-3' of PDRE, which is located within the promoter sequences of its target genes. 218 genes are reported to possess PDRE. Pdr1p is observed to bind PDRE sites on DNA at basal level and also after simulation with toxins. This shows that Pdr1p-DNA interaction isn't dependent on toxic stimulation. This also suggests an involvement of activator(s) or co-activator(s) that induce PDR genes along with Pdr1p. Pdr1p has a functional homolog called Pdr3p encoded by gene called PDR3. Pdr3p is known to be regulated by Pdr3p and Pdr1p. Pdr1p can form a homodimer with itself or heterodimer with Pdr3p.

Loss of function studies of both PDR1 and PDR3 revealed that Pdr1p mutant shows lower tolerance (grows less in culture) against organic toxins such as cycloheximide and oligomycin. This confirms the functions of Pdr1p that confer stronger drug response phenotype than Pdr3p. However, Pdr3p is crucial for PDR responses since cells containing loss of function mutation in both PDR1 and PDR3 genes weren't able to grow at all in the presence of those two toxins.

Both Pdr1p and Pdr3p regulate Pdr5p, which is an ATP-binding cassette transporter. A single amino acid substitution mutation, which is a gain of function mutation of Pdr1p denoted as pdr1-3 (F815S, substitution mutation of Phenylalanine at 815th of the polypeptide by Serine) leads to an over-expression of mRNA of PDR5, which codes for Pdr5p. For cells treated with fluphenazine, Pdr1p was the only transcription factor necessary for PDR response genes induction. But at basal level, Pdr1p can be partially compensated by Pdr3p, a functional homolog of Pdr1p.

== Structure ==
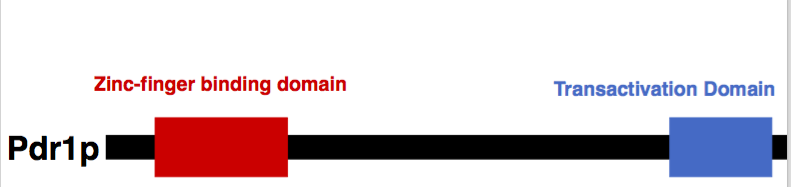
Protein structure of Pdr1p, having two main domains in N- and C-terminus ends.

Pdr1p and Pdr3p is a part of Gal4 transcription factor family due to their zinc-finger DNA binding motif, which is located in N-terminus end of Pdr1p. Pdr1p also contains a long internal region of many inhibitory domains and possess a C-terminal transcription activation domain (amino acids 879–1036). The transcriptional activation domain is rich in glutamine and asparagine, which is theorized to facilitate in protein-protein interaction via hydrogen bonding. A study found that DNA-binding domain of Pdr1p was sufficient for recognizing its endogenous target genes. Strong drug resistance phenotype of yeasts with pdr1-3 is speculated due to its inability to bind to ligands that otherwise cause conformational change to inhibit the transcriptional activity of Pdr1p.

== Interaction with other transcription factors ==
Pdr1p and Pdr3p also interact with other transcription factors and their associated networks such as Yap1p, which controls oxidative stress response, and Rpn4p, which regulates proteasome activities, depending on the kinds of toxins cells face. It is known that Pdr1p induces the expression of Rpn4p.

== Importance ==
Drugs or toxic chemicals are useful in killing pathogenic bacteria or tumor cells, and studying how they mechanistically develop tolerance to a wide range of drugs can improve anti-bacterial and cancer therapeutics. Pdr5p has a similar mechanism of actions and functions to human multidrug resistance protein, whose overexpression is shown to provide chemical tolerance to cancer cells. Studying Pdr5p and how it is regulated by Pdr1p in yeast can give insights into how multi drug resistance occurs in mammals.

By using pdr1-3 and fusing the promoter of Pdr5p to genes that code for membrane proteins of interests, yeast membrane proteins such as Pdr5p, Yor1, and Drs2 can be expressed highly so that they can be efficiently cloned and purified for further studies.

== See also ==
- Multiple drug resistance
