= Translation regulation by 5′ transcript leader cis-elements =

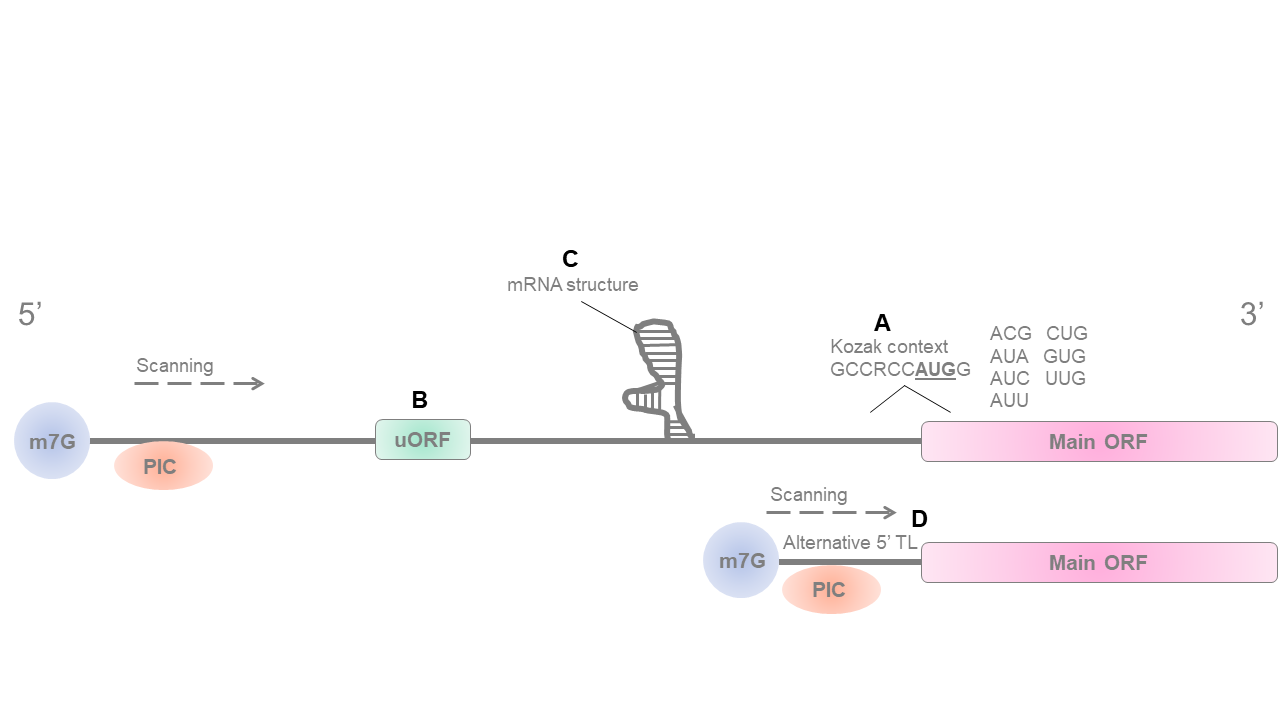
5' TL elements regulate translation initiation.

Translation regulation by 5′ transcript leader cis-elements is a process in cellular translation.

== Background ==
Gene expression is tightly controlled at many different stages. Alterations in translation of mRNA into proteins rapidly modulates the proteome without changing upstream steps such as transcription, pre-mRNA splicing, and nuclear export. The strict regulation of translation in both space and time is in part governed by cis-regulatory elements located in 5′ mRNA transcript leaders (TLs) and 3′ untranslated regions (UTRs).

Due to their role in translation initiation, mRNA 5′ transcript leaders (TLs) strongly influence protein expression. Eukaryotic translation consists of three stages: initiation, elongation, and termination. Translation is primary regulated at the initiation stage where the small ribosomal subunit and initiation factors are recruited to the mRNA; directionally scanning along the 5′ TL to select the first "best" start codon to begin protein synthesis. Cap-dependent ribosomal scanning accounts for 95-97% of all translation in eukaryotes under normal conditions. Therefore, the cis-regulatory elements in TLs greatly influence translation initiation and ultimately protein expression.

== Kozak consensus sequence ==
The first step in initiation is formation of the pre-initiation complex, 48S PIC. The small ribosomal subunit and various eukaryotic initiation factors are recruited to the mRNA 5′ TL and to form the 48S PIC complex, which scans 5′ to 3′ along the mRNA transcript, inspecting each successive triplet for a functional start codon. Translation initiation is most successful at an AUG codon surrounded upstream and downstream by a favorable sequence known as the "Kozak consensus sequence" or "Kozak context". (See A) Weak or absent Kozak context surrounding the AUG leads to "leaky" scanning where the start codon is skipped, whereas a strong Kozak context leads to start codon recognition by the 48S PIC and binding of Met-tRNAi in the "closed" state. Recent studies suggest that initiation occurs surprisingly often in eukaryotes at Near Cognate Codons (NCCs), which differ from AUG by one nucleotide. Eukaryotic initiation factors rearrange the 48S PIC and permit the large subunit to join, thus forming the complete translation competent 80S ribosome.

== uORFs ==
Upstream open reading frames (uORFs) in the 5′ TLs typically inhibit translation of the downstream main protein coding region (CDS). (See B) Translation suppression of the CDS is attributable to the 5′ to 3′ directional nature of 48S PIC scanning. After successfully translating the uORF, the ribosome dissociates from the mRNA as part of termination before it can reach and translate the CDS. This destabilization of the translational machinery can trigger nonsense mediated decay of the mRNA transcript. However, in some cases uORFs will actually enhance the translation of the downstream CDS. For example, in S. cerevisiae, the gene GCN4 has a 5′ TL with multiple uORFs. The uORFs closest to the 5′ cap protect the CDS from the inhibitory activities of the downstream uORFs located closer to the CDS. In summary, uORFs generally decease translation of the main ORF, but they are also capable of increasing protein synthesis under certain circumstances.

== Secondary structure ==
The 3-dimensional structure of the 5′ TL may also impact translation. (See C) Stem-loops have been demonstrated to both inhibit and enhance translation. Stem-loops can prevent cap binding and efficient 48S PIC scanning. Conversely, downstream stem-loops may increase the probability of translation initiation at start codons with a weak Kozak context, possibly by blocking scanning. Besides stem-loops, other higher order structures such as G-quadraplexes and pseudoknots also impede eukaryotic translation. To overcome translati on suppression by structures, DEAD-box RNA helicases unwind RNA structures, promoting scanning through the 5′ TL.

== Alternative transcript leaders ==
Multiple transcription start sites may be used for the same gene generating alternative 5′ TLs with varied length and regulatory features. (See D)This is especially common in organisms with relatively compact genomes such as yeasts. In S. cerevisiae, alternative transcription start sites generate long alternative mRNA TLs with substantially lower translation efficiencies. Counterintuitively, upstream transcriptional induction of these genes actually silences their expression during meiosis by blocking translation. Furthermore, alternative transcription initiation within the CDS may generate protein isoforms with varied functions in S. cerevisiae. These examples from the model organism S. cerevisiae suggest that mRNA transcripts with alternative 5′ TLs may have a regulatory function in eukaryotes especially during events requiring proteome remodeling such as meiosis and stress responses.
