= P300 =

P300 may mean:

- P300 (neuroscience), a neural evoked potential component of the electroencephalogram (EEG)
- p300 (or EP300), a transcriptional coactivator
- Nikon Coolpix P300, a mid-class compact digital camera, produced by Nikon in 2011
