= VP16 =

VP16 may refer to:

- Herpes simplex virus protein vmw65, a viral protein
- Etoposide, also known as VP-16-213, an anticancer drug
- VP-16 (U.S. Navy), a Patrol Squadron of the U.S. Navy
