= Squelching =

Cellular process inhibiting another gene's expression

Squelching is a biological phenomenon in which a strong transcriptional activator acts to inhibit the expression of another gene. Squelching has been mostly studied in yeast, and most of the ideas regarding its mechanisms have come from research into modes of transcriptional control in yeast. One important study of this topic was conducted using the Gal4-VP16 artificial transcription factor system, where it was shown that the activating complex formed by VP-16 was sequestering adapters required for transcription of other targets.

The primary cause of squelching is believed to be the interaction of activator molecules disrupting the biochemical pathways associated with related processes due to structural similarity between the activators and important substrates along that pathway. In particular, the activator binds to transcription factors along alternative biochemical pathways, inhibiting the ability of these transcription factors to bind to their true targets. As in the example above, sequestration of an intermediate in a metabolic pathway is a confounding variable in genetic studies because knowledge of the expected binding targets of the primary molecules involved does not help predict why unexpected behavior results.
