= Houlbec-près-le-Gros-Theil =

- Part of Les Monts du Roumois
- Location of Houlbec-près-le-Gros-Theil
- Location within France Location within Normandy
- Coordinates: 49°15′22″N 0°49′55″E
- Country: France
- Region: Normandy
- Department: Eure
- Arrondissement: Bernay
- Canton: Bourgtheroulde-Infreville
- Commune: Les Monts du Roumois
- Area^{1}: 2.56 km^{2} (0.99 sq mi)
- Elevation: 159 m (522 ft)
- Highest elevation: 167 m (548 ft)
- Lowest elevation: 138 m (453 ft)
- Population (2023): 92
  - Density: 36/km^{2} (93/sq mi)
- Time zone: UTC+01:00 (CET)
  - Summer (DST): UTC+02:00 (CEST)
- Postal code: 27370
- ^{1} French Land Register data, which excludes lakes, ponds, glaciers > 1 km^{2} (0.386 sq mi or 247 acres) and river estuaries.

Houlbec-près-le-Gros-Theil (French pronunciation: [ulbɛk pʁɛ lə ɡʁo tɛj], literally Houlbec near Le Gros-Theil) is a former commune in the Eure department in northern France. On 1 January 2017, it was merged into the new commune Les Monts du Roumois.

== See also ==
- Communes of the Eure department
