= GAL4/UAS system =

Biochemical method

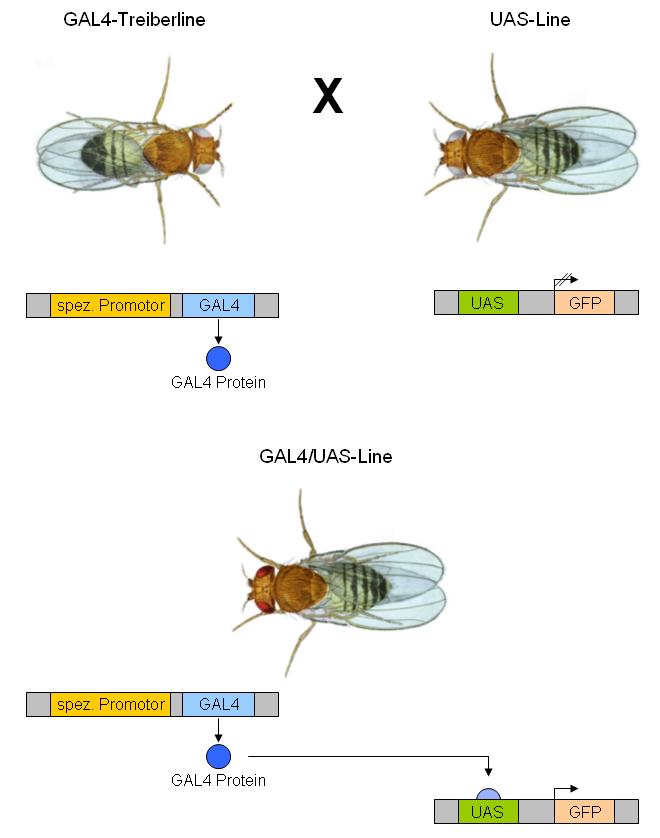
An example GAL4-UAS system, with GAL4 lines and UAS reporter lines.

The GAL4-UAS system is a biochemical method used to study gene expression and function in organisms such as the fruit fly. It is based on the finding by Hitoshi Kakidani and Mark Ptashne, and Nicholas Webster and Pierre Chambon in 1988 that Gal4 binding to UAS sequences activates gene expression. The method was introduced into flies by Andrea Brand and Norbert Perrimon in 1993 and is considered a powerful technique for studying the expression of genes. The system has two parts: the Gal4 gene, encoding the yeast transcription activator protein Gal4, and the UAS (Upstream Activation Sequence), an enhancer to which GAL4 specifically binds to activate gene transcription.

== Overview ==
The Gal4 system allows separation of the problems of defining which cells express a gene or protein and what the experimenter wants to do with this knowledge. Geneticists have created genetic variants of model organisms (typically fruit flies), called GAL4 lines, each of which expresses GAL4 in some subset of the animal's tissues. For example, some lines might express GAL4 only in muscle cells, or only in nerves, or only in the antennae, and so on. For fruit flies in particular, there are tens of thousands of such lines, with the most useful expressing GAL4 in only a very specific subset of the animal—perhaps, for example, only those neurons that connect two specific compartments of the fly's brain. The presence of GAL4, by itself, in these cells has little or no effect, since GAL4's main effect is to bind to a UAS region, and most cells have no (or innocuous) UAS regions.

Since Gal4 by itself is not visible, and has little effect on cells, the other necessary part of this system are the "reporter lines". These are strains of flies with the special UAS region next to a desired gene. These genetic instructions occur in every cell of the animal, but in most cells nothing happens since that cell is not producing GAL4. In the cells that are producing GAL4, however, the UAS is activated, the gene next to it is turned on, and it starts producing its resulting protein. This may report to the investigator which cells are expressing GAL4, hence the term "reporter line", but genes intended to manipulate the cell behavior are often used as well.

Typical reporter genes include:

- Fluorescent proteins like green (GFP) or red fluorescent proteins (RFP), which allow scientists to see which cells express Gal4
- Channelrhodopsin, which allows light-sensitive triggering of nerve cells
- Halorhodopsin, which conversely allows light to suppress the firing of neurons
- Shibire, which shuts neurons off, but only at higher temperatures (30 °C and above). Flies with this gene can be raised and tested at lower temperatures where their neurons will behave normally. Then the body temperature of the flies can be raised (since they are cold-blooded), and these neurons turn off. If the fly's behavior changes, this gives a strong clue to what those neurons do.
- GECI (Genetically Encoded Calcium Indicator), often a member of the GCaMP family of proteins. These proteins fluoresce when exposed to calcium, which, in most cells, happens when the neuron fires. This allows scientists to take pictures, or movies, that show the nervous system in operation.

For example, scientists can first visualize a class of neurons by choosing a fly from a GAL4 line that expresses GAL4 in the desired set of neurons, and crossing it with a reporter line that express GFP. In the offspring, the desired subset of cells will make GAL4, and in these cells the GAL4 will bind to the UAS, and enable the production of GFP. So the desired subset of cells will now fluoresce green and can be followed with a fluorescence microscope. Next, to figure out what these cells might do, the experimenter might express channelrhodopsin in each of these cells, by crossing the same GAL4 line with a channelrhodopsin reporter line. In the offspring the selected cells, and only those cells, will contain channelrhodopsin and can be triggered by a bright light. Now the scientist can trigger these particular cells at will, and examine the resulting behavior to see what these cells might do.

== Operation ==
Gal4 is a modular protein consisting broadly of a DNA-binding domain and an activation domain. The UAS to which GAL4 binds is CGG-N_{11}-CCG, where N can be any base. Although GAL4 is a yeast protein not normally present in other organisms it has been shown to work as a transcription activator in a variety of organisms such as Drosophila, and human cells, highlighting that the same mechanisms for gene expression have been conserved over the course of evolution.

For study in Drosophila, the GAL4 gene is placed under the control of a native gene promoter, or driver gene, while the UAS controls expression of a target gene. GAL4 is then only expressed in cells where the driver gene is usually active. In turn, GAL4 should only activate gene transcription where a UAS has been introduced. For example, by fusing a gene encoding a visible marker like GFP (Green Fluorescent Protein) the expression pattern of the driver genes can be determined. GAL4 and the UAS are very useful for studying gene expression in Drosophila as they are not normally present and their expression does not interfere with other processes in the cell. For example, GAL4/UAS-regulated transgenes in Drosophila have been used to alter glial expression to produce arrhythmic behavior in a known rhythmic circadian output called pigment dispersing factor (PDF). However, some research has indicated that over-expression of GAL4 in Drosophila can have side-effects, probably relating to immune and stress responses to what is essentially an alien protein.

The GAL4-UAS system has also been employed to study gene expression in organisms besides Drosophila such as the African clawed frog Xenopus and zebrafish.

The GAL4/UAS system is also utilized in Two-Hybrid Screening, a method of identifying interactions between two proteins or a protein with DNA.

== Extensions ==
Gal4 expression can be made even more specific by means of "intersectional strategies". These can combine two different GAL4 lines—say, A and B—in a way that GAL4 is only expressed in the cells that are in line A but not line B, or those that are in both lines A and B. When combined with intrinsically sparse GAL4 lines, this offers very specific selection, often limited to a single cell type. The disadvantage is that at least three independent insertion sites are required, so the lines must use different and independent insertion sites, and creating the desired final organisms needs more than a single cross. This is a very active field of research, and there are many such intersectional strategies, of which two are discussed below.

One way to create GAL4 expression in the cells that are in line A but not line B, requires line A to be made to express GAL4, and line B made to express Gal80, which is a GAL4 inhibitor. Therefore, only the cells that are in A but not B will have active GAL4, which can then drive the reporter gene.

To express GAL4 in only the cells contained in both A and B, a technique called "split-GAL4" can be used. Line A is made to express half of the GAL4 protein, which is inactive by itself. Similarly, line B is made to express the other half of GAL4, also inactive by itself. Only the cells that are in both lines make both halves, which self-assemble by leucine zipper into GAL4 and activate the reporter gene.
