= Andrea Brand =

Molecular Biologist

Andrea Brand FRS FMedSci
- Born: Andrea Hilary Brand; March 9, 1959 (age 67)
- Education: University of Oxford (BA); University of Cambridge (PhD)
- Known for: GAL4/UAS system
- Awards: EMBO Member; William Bate Hardy Prize (2004); Rosalind Franklin Award (2005)
- Scientific career
- Workplaces: University of Cambridge; Laboratory of Molecular Biology; Gurdon Institute; Harvard University
- Thesis: Characterisation of a yeast silencer sequence (1986)
- Website: www.gurdon.cam.ac.uk/research/brand

Andrea Hilary Brand (born March 9, 1959) is the Herchel Smith Professor of Molecular Biology and a Fellow of Jesus College, Cambridge. She heads a lab investigating nervous system development at the Gurdon Institute and the Department of Physiology, Development and Neuroscience. She developed the GAL4/UAS system with Norbert Perrimon which has been described as “a fly geneticist's Swiss army knife”.

== Early life and education ==
Brand was born in the U.S., where her father was an economist at the United Nations in New York. She graduated from the UN International School in New York and in 1977, inspired by the work of Rosalind Franklin, she moved to Britain to study biochemistry at the University of Oxford. She studied at Oxford from 1977 to 1981, earning a Bachelor of Arts degree with Honors. From there she went to the Laboratory of Molecular Biology at the University of Cambridge. She was there from 1981 to 1986, in which year she was awarded a Ph.D.

== Career and research ==
=== Postdoctoral work ===
She then engaged in postdoctoral research work on yeast transcription at Harvard University, where from 1986 to 1988 she was a Helen Hay Whitney Fellow in the Department of Biochemistry, associated with the laboratory of Mark Ptashne. Having decided to switch from biochemistry to neurobiology, Brand moved in the late 1980s to Norbert Perrimon's laboratory in the Department of Genetics at Harvard Medical School, where from 1988 to 1993 she was a Leukemia Society Special Fellow.

It was there that Brand conceived of the GAL4 system, which Lancet has described as "an ingenious toolkit that allows researchers to turn on genes in any cell type and at any time of development, and thus engineer and test the function of both genes and proteins. The effect of this system on fly genetics is hard to exaggerate — one scientist has described it as 'a fly geneticist's Swiss army knife'. By causing cells to express cell death genes — and effectively commit suicide — the system can model diabetes by killing insulin-producing cells. 'It has also been used to express mutant versions of proteins to model neurodegenerative diseases, such as Alzheimer's', says Brand. Now the most highly cited paper in the Drosophila (fruit flies) field, Brand had considerable difficulty in getting the paper published." Lancet notes that the GAL4 system remains "at the heart of Brand's current work on Drosophila neural stem cells. Because of the similarities between Drosophila and mammalian neural stem cells in their ability to self-renew and differentiate into different types of neurons and glial cells, the work has the potential to help develop therapies for neurodegenerative diseases such as Parkinson's."

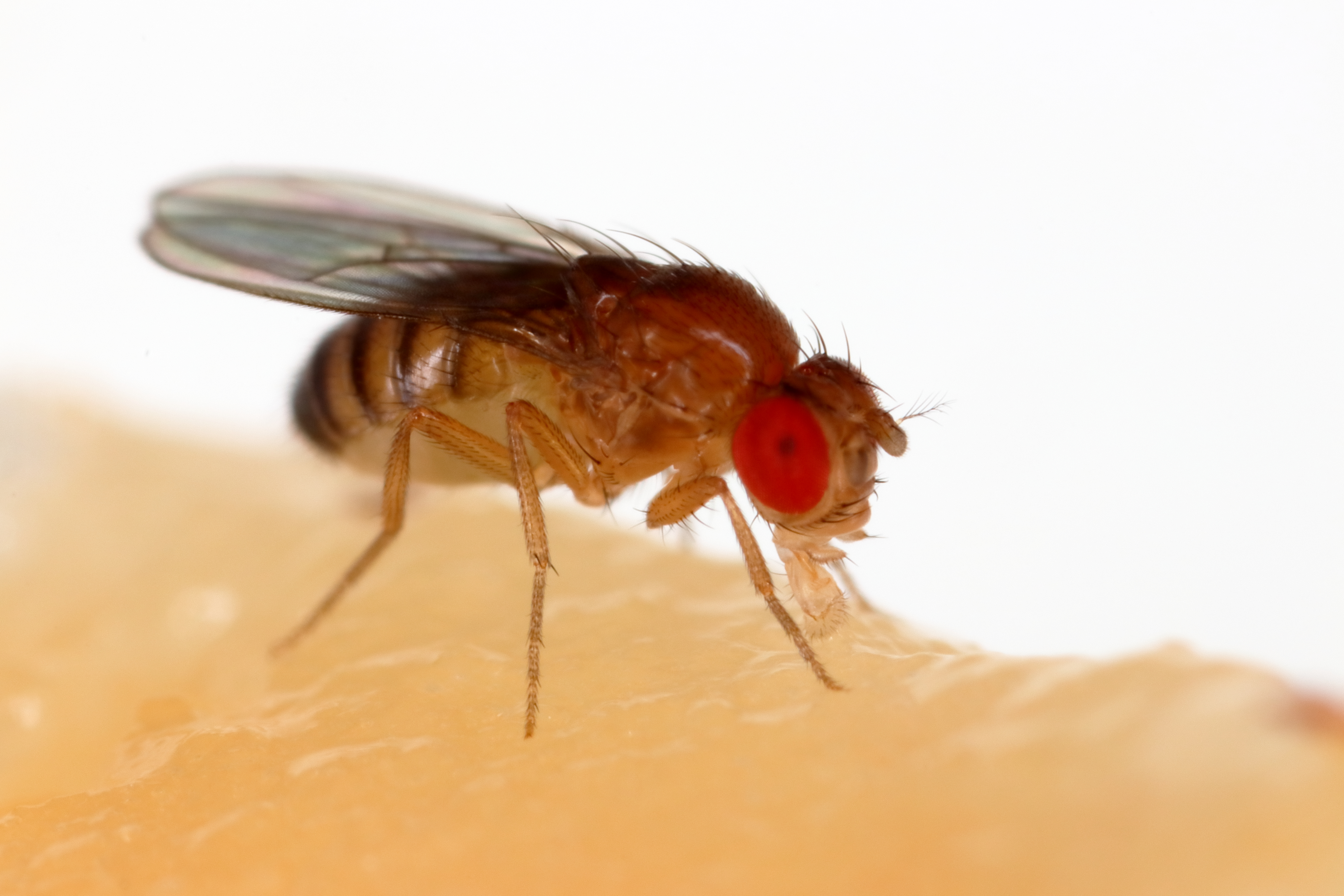
Drosophila melanogaster, one of the objects of Brand's science

=== Wellcome Trust/Cancer Research UK Gurdon Institute ===
From 1993 to 2003, Brand was a Wellcome Trust Senior Fellow in Basic Biomedical Research at Wellcome Trust/Cancer Research UK Gurdon Institute. From 2003 to 2007, she was Director of Research in Developmental Neurobiology at the same institution. Since 2005 she has been Senior Group Leader there, and since 2007 she has been the Herchel Smith Professor of Molecular Biology both at that institution and at the Department of Physiology, Development and Neuroscience, University of Cambridge.

During these years Brand has performed work on nervous-system development that the Royal Society has described as “pioneering.” According to the Royal Society, her study of the embryonic nervous system in fruit flies (drosophila melanogaster) “has led to new insights into the biology of neural stem cells, and the ability of neurons to regenerate after damage.” Moreover, Brand “identified a novel role for a key regulator in cell division in controlling the strength of neuronal connections,” which “could help uncover new drug targets in the search for treatments for neural disorders such as Parkinson's and Huntington's disease.” As one source explains, “Brand is looking for stem cells in adult fruit flies' brains and trying to understand how genes are regulated throughout life. The aim of the work is to learn how to control cells to produce the right neuron at the right place at the right time. One protein, known by the name Prospero, is responsible for regulating stem cells to produce cells which produce neurons. Without the Prospero protein (PROX1), tumours result.

Brand has provided this explanation of her work: “One of the goals of research in neurobiology is to repair or regenerate neurons after damage to the brain or spinal cord. Before we can understand how to repair the nervous system, however, we must first learn how the nervous system is put together. Of all the tissues and organs in the human body the nervous system is the most intricate and complex, consisting of more than one trillion neurons. These neurons make precise connections with each other to form functional networks that can transmit information at amazing speed over considerable distances.”

“Neurons are produced by multipotent precursors called stem cells. Neural stem cells divide in a self-renewing manner, generating daughter cells that give rise to different types of neurons. The aim of our work is to identify the genes that direct the different behaviours of cells in the developing nervous system. When we identify the genes that specify the characteristic behaviours of each of the different cell types in the nervous system, it may become possible to manipulate them in such a way as to induce stem cells to become neurons at will, or induce neurons to regenerate.”

“In earlier work,” the Royal Society has noted, “Dr Brand characterised the first transcriptional silencer and originated the GAL4 system for targeted gene expression during development. The GAL4 system has been adapted for use in many other model organisms; it has had a major influence on developmental biology.” This system has been described as “a fly geneticist's Swiss army knife”.[5]

Brand, both alone and in collaboration with her coworkers, has published papers in such scientific journals as Public Health Genomics, Developmental Biology, Cell, Journal of Reproductive Immunology, Development, Journal of Biological Chemistry, Clinical Genetics, Neural Development, Journal of Neuroscience, Journal of Cell Science, and Blood.

=== Other activities ===
From 1999 to 2004, Brand served on the Scientific Advisory Board of the Promega Corporation in Madison, Wisconsin. In 2002 she was an Invited Professor at the Ecole Normale Superieure in Paris.

From 2003 to 2007 she was a member of the editorial board of BioEssays, from 2003 to 2006 she was on the Academic Careers Committee of The Academy of Medical Sciences in London, and from 2007 to 2010 she was on the Sectional Committee of the Academy of Medical Sciences. In 2009 she served as Vice Chair of the Neuroscience Review Panel of the Swedish Research Council, and in the same year she was elected to a Fellowship at Jesus College, University of Cambridge. In 2010 she was Chair of the Selection Committee for the Genetics and Developmental Biology Department of the Institut Curie in Paris. In 2011 she was a visiting professor at the School of Biological Sciences of the University of Sydney in Australia and served on review panels for the Developmental Biology Unit at EMBL in Heidelberg and for the National Centre for Biological Sciences in Bangalore.

She serves on the editorial boards of BioMed Central Biology Image Library (since 2005), Fly, and Neural Development (both since 2006). She is a founding board member of the Rosalind Franklin Society, established in 2006, and since 2006 has been a member of the Evaluation Board of the Institute of Biochemistry at ETH in Zurich, Switzerland. Since 2007 she has been on the Steering Group of Women in Science, Engineering and Technology; since 2008 she has been a patron of the Cambridge Science Festival, and since 2008 she has been on the Scientific Advisory Board of the MRC Centre for Developmental Neurobiology at King's College, London. From 2009 to 2013 she is on the EMBO Young Investigator Programme Committee; from 2011 to 2014, she is on the Royal Society Sectional Committee; and from 2010 to 2013 she is a member of the Royal Society Research Appointment Panel.

Brand was the chair of the jury that awarded the Royal Society Young People's Book Prize 2012 to Robert Winston's Science Experiments.

=== Honors and awards ===
Brand was elected a Fellow of the Royal Society (FRS) in 2010, and a Fellow of the Academy of Medical Sciences (FMedSci) in 2003 and a Member of the European Molecular Biology Organisation in 2000. She was awarded the Royal Society Rosalind Franklin Award in 2006.

Brand was presented with the Special Award of Excellence at the Wellcome Biomedical Imaging Awards in 2001, the Hooke Medal of the British Society of Cell Biology in 2002, and the William Bate Hardy Prize in 2004.

In 2006, Brand was presented with the Royal Society's Rosalind Franklin Award, which “recognises excellent scientific research and promotes women in science, engineering and technology.” She was selected for the award in recognition of “her groundbreaking contributions to the fields of gene regulation, developmental biology, cell biology and neurobiology.” Professor Julia Higgins, Vice President of the Royal Society, said: “Dr Andrea Brand is an extremely talented biologist. Her work, connecting molecular genetics to the development and repair of the nervous system, has been of a consistently high standard and is directly relevant to tackling human disease.” Winners of the Rosalind Franklin Award are asked to undertake projects that raise the profile of women in science; Brand fulfilled this obligation by organizing two lecture series, one for schoolchildren and the other for university students, featuring prominent female researchers working in cell and developmental biology. On being informed of the award, Brand said: “I am truly honoured to receive the Rosalind Franklin Award. I was inspired to become a molecular biologist at the age of 15 after reading about Rosalind Franklin's work on solving the structure of DNA.”

Her nomination for the Royal Society reads

Andrea Brand is distinguished for her pioneering work on the development of the nervous system. Using Drosophila as a model organism, and employing the most sophisticated and innovative live imaging techniques, she has explained how cell fate determinants become localised to one side of a cell, allowing neural precursors to divide asymmetrically in a stem cell-like fashion. In earlier work Dr Brand characterised the first transcriptional silencer and originated the GAL4 system for targeted gene expression during development. The GAL4 system has been adapted for use in many other model organisms; it has had a major influence on developmental biology.

In 2026, Brand was elected to the National Academy of Sciences.

== Personal life ==
Brand has been a “dancer her whole life,” having learned ballet as a child. She later became a gymnast, serving as team captain at Oxford. While living in Boston in the mid-1980s she took a two-week workshop with the Mark Morris Dance Company, spending “2 absolutely fantastic weeks of dancing 7 hours a day, and becoming friends with dancers in the company.”
