= Madeleine Gans =

French geneticist

Professor Madeleine Gans
- Born: Madeleine David; 1920 06 05; Pont-à-Mousson, France
- Died: 2018 04 18; Saint-Rémy-lès-Chevreuse, France
- Education: Medical doctor and biological doctor
- Known for: Developmental genetics of Drosophila melanogaster
- Awards: French Académie des Sciences
- Scientific career
- Fields: Genetics, Developmental Genetics
- Institutions: Institut de Biologie Physico-Chimique IBPC, CNRS Gif-sur-Yvette, Faculté des Sciences de Paris, Université-Pierre-et-Marie-Curie
- Thesis: Etude génétique et physiologique du mutant zeste de Drosophila melanogaster (1951)
- Doctoral advisor: Boris Ephrussi
- Notable students: Denise Busson, Danièle Thierry-Mieg, Norbert Perrimon

Madeleine Gans (1920–2018) was a French geneticist known for her work on the genetics of the fruit fly Drosophila melanogaster. She was nominated professor in 1961 at the Faculty of Sciences of Paris and from 1968 at the Université Pierre-et-Marie-Curie. In 1987, she was nominated corresponding member of the French Académie des Sciences.

== Early life and education ==
Madeleine Gans, birth name Madeleine David, was born on June 5, 1920, in Pont-à-Mousson, Lorraine, France. Her father was an engineer and her mother a school teacher in mathematics. She attended high school in Pont-à-Mousson and graduated in June 1939. Starting that same year, she pursued her education at the University of Nancy, entering both medical and scientific tracks. In 1940, due to the Second World War, Madeleine Gans and her family left Pont-à-Mousson and Nancy to take refuge first in Britany (Rennes), then in Larche and Toulouse, in non-occupied south-west France. From October 1940 to September 1945, Madeleine Gans was able to continue her education in Toulouse where she obtained degrees in medicine and in science.

In October 1945, Boris Ephrussi recruited Madeleine Gans in his laboratory. In February 1946, a lemon yellow eyed spontaneous mutant appeared in the Drosophila melanogaster laboratory collection. Ephrussi assigned Madeleine Gans to study this mutant, named zeste, for her training in genetics. On December 21, 1951, she defended her doctoral thesis "Etude génétique et physiologique du mutant zeste de Drosophila melanogaster", which was published in French in 1953.

== Career ==
In 1952, she became "Chargée de recherche" (Research project leader). From 1953 onwards she switched to a university teaching career, first as « Chef de travaux pratiques » (Head of the laboratory courses) at the Sorbonne. In 1957, she left the IBPC to establish a research team with Georges Prévost in the CNRS Physiological Genetics Centre in Gif-sur-Yvette. She started as a professor from 1961. In 1968 Gans joined the Molecular Genetics Centre at the CNRS in Gif-sur-Yvette. Gans retired in 1990.

== Research ==
Gans's thesis work was on the Drosophila zeste (z) mutant where she showed that the z mutation is localized very near the white+ (w+) gene. She studied genic dosage between z, z+, and w+, and demonstrated that the z mutant phenotype strictly depends on the presence of two doses of the w+ gene. She showed that this property is subject to position effect as the w+ gene activity is abolished or reduced when it is transferred close to centromeric heterochromatin via chromosomal rearrangements. Finally, she precisely characterized conditions leading to variegated eye pigmentation, such as external parameters (temperature) or genetic contexts.

In 1955, Georges Prévost, a new young researcher, recruited as « Chef de travaux pratiques» in the Department of Genetics at the Faculty of Sciences of Paris. Gans and Prévost started a new project using the Basidiomycete Coprinus as a model organism. Their research subjects followed two main paths: isolation of mutants and analysis of their metabolism and the use of the dicaryotic phase to answer fundamental questions concerning nuclear exchanges. The work mainly focused on the study of the pyrimidine and arginine pathways. The fine structure map of the ur-1 complex locus was determined. These two genes control the first two stages of the pyrimidine biosynthetic pathway. In Coprinus the results obtained led to a model whereby carbamyl-phosphate would be produced by two enzymatic complexes having different cellular localizations: mitochondrial for the enzymes of the arginine chain and cytoplasmic for those of the pyrimidine chain.

As of 1970, Gans returned to the Drosophila model and focused on the identification and analysis of mutants involved in development. Gans and collaborators undertook several systematic mutagenesis using Ethyl-Methane-Sulfonate (EMS) to screen for such female-sterile mutations linked to the X chromosome, leading to specific anomalies in the embryo, larva or adult specifically. Gans also worked on the female-sterile mutants named ovoD, and she determined that some viable flies among the progeny did not result from mitotic recombination but rather from phenotypic reversion of ovoD mutations in the female germ line. In 1989, Gans and collaborators showed that the mobilization of gypsy and copia transposons was able to induce ovoD reversions.

== Selected publications ==
- Gans, Madeleine; Audit, Claudie; Masson, Michele (1975-12-01). "Isolation and Characterization of Sex-Linked Female-Sterile Mutants in Drosophila Melanogaster". Genetics. 81 (4): 683–704. doi:10.1093/genetics/81.4.683. ISSN 1943-2631. PMC 1213428. PMID 814037.
- Prud'homme, N; Gans, M; Masson, M; Terzian, C; Bucheton, A (1995-02-01). "Flamenco, a gene controlling the gypsy retrovirus of Drosophila melanogaster". Genetics. 139 (2): 697–711. doi:10.1093/genetics/139.2.697. ISSN 1943-2631. PMC 1206375. PMID 7713426.

== Awards and honors ==
in 1987 Gans was named a correspondent of the French Academy of Sciences.
