= Les Monts du Roumois =

- Commune
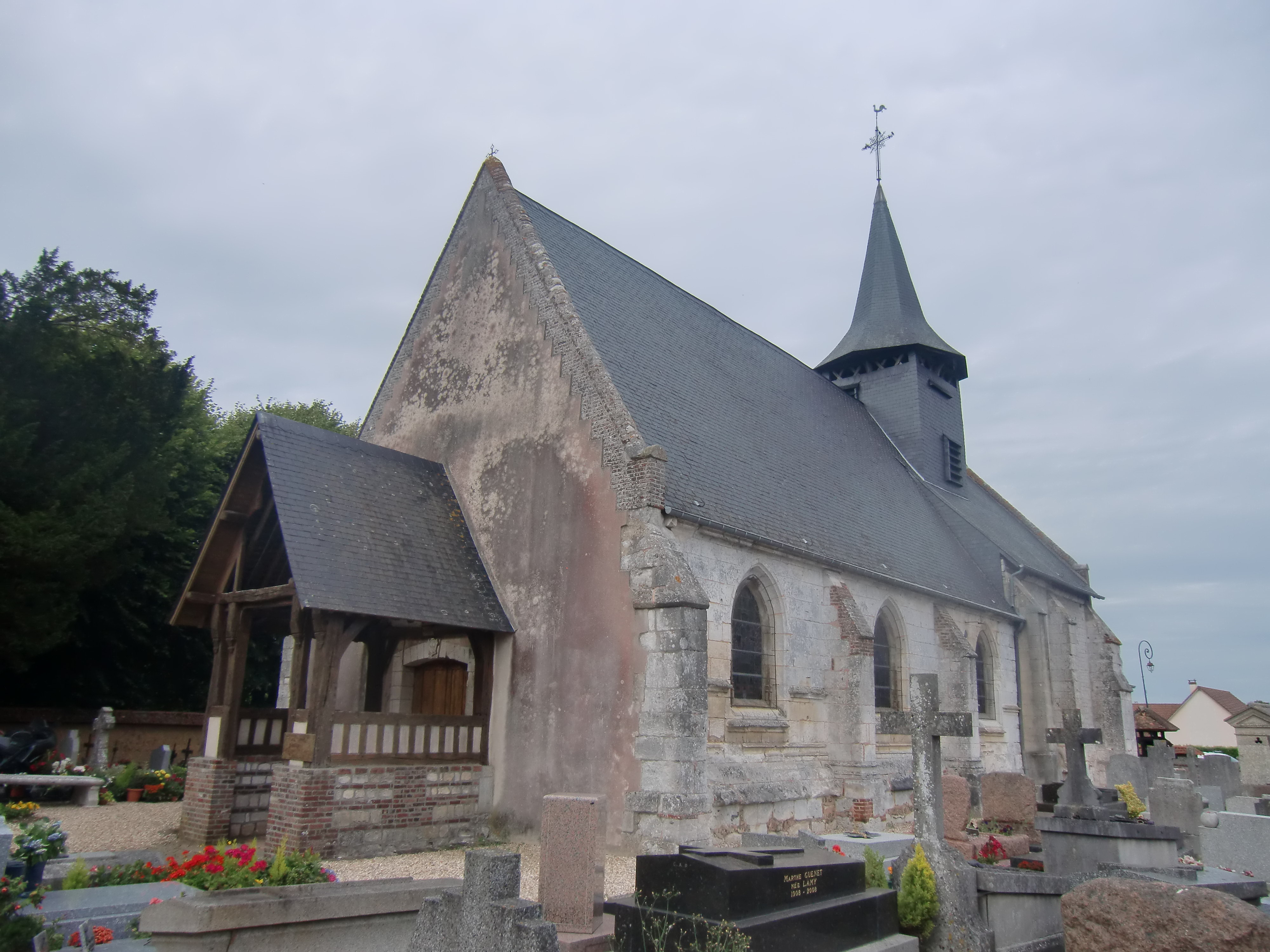
- The church in Berville-en-Roumois
- Location of Les Monts du Roumois
- Location within France Location within Normandy
- Coordinates: 49°17′49″N 0°49′23″E
- Country: France
- Region: Normandy
- Department: Eure
- Arrondissement: Bernay
- Canton: Grand Bourgtheroulde
- Intercommunality: Roumois Seine
- Area^{1}: 23.81 km^{2} (9.19 sq mi)
- Population (2023): 1,639
  - Density: 68.84/km^{2} (178.3/sq mi)
- Time zone: UTC+01:00 (CET)
  - Summer (DST): UTC+02:00 (CEST)
- INSEE/Postal code: 27062 /27370, 27520
- ^{1} French Land Register data, which excludes lakes, ponds, glaciers > 1 km^{2} (0.386 sq mi or 247 acres) and river estuaries.

Les Monts du Roumois is a commune in the department of Eure, northern France. The municipality was established on 1 January 2017 by merger of the former communes of Berville-en-Roumois (the seat), Bosguérard-de-Marcouville and Houlbec-près-le-Gros-Theil.

== See also ==
- Communes of the Eure department
