= Sara Cherry =

American microbiologist

Sara R. Cherry
- Education: University of California, Berkeley (BS); Massachusetts Institute of Technology (PhD)
- Scientific career
- Fields: Microbiology
- Workplaces: University of Pennsylvania; Harvard Medical School
- Thesis: The regulation of V(D)J recombination (1999)
- Doctoral advisor: David Baltimore

Sara R. Cherry is an American microbiologist who is John W. Eckman Professor of Medical Science and Professor of Microbiology in Biochemistry and Biophysics at the Perelman School of Medicine at the University of Pennsylvania. Her research involves genetic and mechanistic studies of virus–host interactions. During the COVID-19 pandemic, Cherry looked to identify novel therapeutic strategies.

== Early life and education ==
Cherry grew up in Brooklyn, New York. Her mother was born in Germany in a displaced persons camp and migrated to the United States. Her father was from Poland and passed through Ellis Island. Her parents were the first in their families to attend college and eventually became academics at Brooklyn College. Her mother was eventually made Head of Audiology at Brooklyn College. During her time at high school Cherry completed work experience in laboratories in New York City. Here she studied the feeding habits of amoeba and proteoglycans. She eventually studied chemistry at the University of California, Berkeley, and graduated in 1994. During her undergraduate research she looked at new synthesis pathways for drug scaffolds with Peter G. Schultz. She moved to Massachusetts Institute of Technology for her doctoral research, where she worked on V(D)J recombination with David Baltimore. During her research she recognised that, contrary to what was previously thought, demethylation was not responsible for the activation of V(D)J recombination. It was under the guidance of Baltimore that Cherry became fascinated by virology. When considering further research positions, Cherry knew that she wanted to learn more about viruses, and develop an unbiased, systematic genetic screening protocol. She was a postdoctoral fellow at Harvard Medical School, where she worked with Norbert Perrimon on the development of high-throughput screening to monitor virus-host cell interactions.

== Research and career ==
In 2006 Cherry joined the Perelman School of Medicine at the University of Pennsylvania. Here she combined her experience with high-throughput RNA interference (RNAi) screening with other cell-based screening techniques. Cherry studies viral pathogenesis, which includes both the ways viruses replicate and the anti-virus mechanisms within host cells. She is interested in how viruses hijack the machinery within a cell whilst evading their defence mechanisms. She primarily studies arthropod–borne viruses that impact RNA, including West Nile virus and Zika virus, as well as alphaviruses and bunyavirales. Arthropod-borne viruses contain very little genetic information (around 11 kilobytes), but can infect and replicate in a variety of hosts. Her research makes use of the model organism drosophila, high-throughput screening, functional genomics and forward genetics to better identify the genes that impact the life cycle of a virus. In 2017 she demonstrated an inhibitor to Zika virus, a mosquito-borne virus that had previously evaded treatment. Zika virus enters human cells through endocytosis, and bind to the cell's outer membrane via the clathrin. Cherry demonstrated that the antiviral Nanchangmycin restricts this mode of entry. Alongside her work in virology, Cherry has started to screen acute leukaemia patients to better understand how they will respond to advance therapeutics.

During the COVID-19 pandemic Cherry looked to identify novel therapeutic strategies, making use of her extensive small molecule library to identify chemical compounds that are active against SARS-CoV-2. She has investigated remdesivir, an antiviral that was developed for the Ebola virus disease, and chloroquine, an antimalarial medication. She used the high-throughput screening facility at the biosafety level-3 laboratory at the University of Pennsylvania to screen thousands of drugs at a time. Remdesivir is a nucleoside analogue that tries to stop the spread of the virus by forcing it to make mistakes when replicating its RNA, causing the strands themselves to break. She has also considered therapies that prevent the virus from ever entering cells, either through the modification of the virus or the host itself. The treatment may also come in the form of an interferon. To determine which treatments will be most appropriate, Cherry looks to identify which proteins SARS-CoV-2 makes use of for infection. As the availability of N95 masks decreased, Cherry purchased several powered air-purifying respirators (PAPRs) battery-driven hoods that circulate filtered air for members of her research team.

== The Cherry Lab ==
Sara Cherry is the head of a laboratory at the University of Pennsylvania's Pathology Department. The main focus of this lab is to research the connection between viruses and their hosts. Recently, they have been researching how RNA binding proteins and RNA decay machinery act within innate antiviral. This has been looked into and applied mainly on COVID-19. In the past, the Cherry Lab has conducted studies on the role of antivirals when it comes to COVID-19. They have been able to conclude that when nucleoside biogenesis inhibitors are combined with nucleoside analogs, SARS-CoV-2 infection can be blocked. Getting a better grasp of this concept is the focus of their future studies. The Cherry Lab also performs research in the fields of oncology and precision medicine, and they do so by working with other scientists across the University of Pennsylvania. The laboratory employs scientists of all skill levels and statuses.

== Awards and honours ==
- 2011 Burroughs Wellcome Investigators in the Pathogenesis of Infectious Disease Award
- 2019 Perelman School of Medicine Awards of Excellence Stanley N. Cohen Biomedical Research Award

== Selected publications ==
- Lee, Peggy P.; Fitzpatrick, David R.; Beard, Caroline; Jessup, Heidi K.; Lehar, Sophie; Makar, Karen W.; Pérez-Melgosa, Mercedes; Sweetser, Marianne T.; Schlissel, Mark S.; Nguyen, Suzanne; Cherry, Sara R. (2001-11-01). "A Critical Role for Dnmt1 and DNA Methylation in T Cell Development, Function, and Survival". Immunity. 15 (5): 763–774. doi:10.1016/S1074-7613(01)00227-8. ISSN 1074-7613. PMID 11728338.
- Buchon, Nicolas; Silverman, Neal; Cherry, Sara (December 2014). "Immunity in Drosophila melanogaster — from microbial recognition to whole-organism physiology". Nature Reviews Immunology. 14 (12): 796–810. doi:10.1038/nri3763. ISSN 1474-1741. PMC 6190593. PMID 25421701.
- Shelly, Spencer; Lukinova, Nina; Bambina, Shelly; Berman, Allison; Cherry, Sara (2009-04-17). "Autophagy Is an Essential Component of Drosophila Immunity against Vesicular Stomatitis Virus". Immunity. 30 (4): 588–598. doi:10.1016/j.immuni.2009.02.009. ISSN 1074-7613. PMC 2754303. PMID 19362021.

Cherry serves on the editorial board of the Journal of Experimental Medicine. She serves on the Board of the Society of Functional Precision Medicine.
