= Transcriptional activator =

Protein that increases transcription of a gene or set of genes

A transcriptional activator is a protein (transcription factor) that increases transcription of a gene or set of genes. Activators are considered to have positive control over gene expression, as they function to promote gene transcription and, in some cases, are required for the transcription of genes to occur. Most activators are DNA-binding proteins that bind to enhancers or promoter-proximal elements. The DNA site bound by the activator is referred to as an "activator-binding site". The part of the activator that makes protein–protein interactions (PPIs) with the general transcription machinery is referred to as an "activating region" or "activation domain".

Most activators function by binding sequence-specifically to a regulatory DNA site located near a promoter and making protein–protein interactions with the general transcription machinery (RNA polymerase and general transcription factors), thereby facilitating the binding of the general transcription machinery to the promoter. Other activators help promote gene transcription by triggering RNA polymerase to release from the promoter and proceed along the DNA. At times, RNA polymerase can pause shortly after leaving the promoter; activators also function to allow these "stalled" RNA polymerases to continue transcription.

The activity of activators can be regulated. Some activators have an allosteric site and can only function when a certain molecule binds to this site, essentially turning the activator on. Post-translational modifications to activators can also regulate activity, increasing or decreasing activity depending on the type of modification and activator being modified.

In some cells, usually eukaryotes, multiple activators can bind to the binding-site; these activators tend to bind cooperatively and interact synergistically.

== Structure ==
Activator proteins consist of two main domains: a DNA-binding domain that binds to a DNA sequence specific to the activator, and an activation domain that functions to increase gene transcription by interacting with other molecules. Activator DNA-binding domains come in a variety of conformations, including the helix-turn-helix, zinc finger, and leucine zipper among others. These DNA-binding domains are specific to a certain DNA sequence, allowing activators to turn on only certain genes. Activation domains also come in a variety of types that are categorized based on the domain's amino acid sequence, including alanine-rich, glutamine-rich, and acidic domains. These domains are not as specific, and tend to interact with a variety of target molecules.

Activators can also have allosteric sites that are responsible for turning the activators themselves on and off.

== Mechanism of action ==
=== Activator binding to regulatory sequences ===
Within the grooves of the DNA double helix, functional groups of the base pairs are exposed. The sequence of the DNA thus creates a unique pattern of surface features, including areas of possible hydrogen bonding, ionic bonding, as well as hydrophobic interactions. Activators also have unique sequences of amino acids with side chains that are able to interact with the functional groups in DNA. Thus, the pattern of amino acid side chains making up an activator protein will be complementary to the surface features of the specific DNA regulatory sequence it was designed to bind to. The complementary interactions between the amino acids of the activator protein and the functional groups of the DNA create an "exact-fit" specificity between the activator and its regulatory DNA sequence.

Most activators bind to the major grooves of the double helix, as these areas tend to be wider, but there are some that will bind to the minor grooves.

Activator-binding sites may be located very close to the promoter or numerous base pairs away. If the regulatory sequence is located far away, the DNA will loop over itself (DNA looping) in order for the bound activator to interact with the transcription machinery at the promoter site.

In prokaryotes, multiple genes can be transcribed together (operon), and are thus controlled under the same regulatory sequence. In eukaryotes, genes tend to be transcribed individually, and each gene is controlled by its own regulatory sequences. Regulatory sequences where activators bind are commonly found upstream from the promoter, but they can also be found downstream or even within introns in eukaryotes.

=== Functions to increase gene transcription ===
Binding of the activator to its regulatory sequence promotes gene transcription by enabling RNA polymerase activity. This is done through various mechanisms, such as recruiting transcription machinery to the promoter and triggering RNA polymerase to continue into elongation.

==== Recruitment ====
Activator-controlled genes require the binding of activators to regulatory sites in order to recruit the necessary transcription machinery to the promoter region.

Activator interactions with RNA polymerase are mostly direct in prokaryotes and indirect in eukaryotes. In prokaryotes, activators tend to make contact with the RNA polymerase directly in order to help bind it to the promoter. In eukaryotes, activators mostly interact with other proteins, and these proteins will then be the ones to interact with the RNA polymerase.

===== Prokaryotes =====
In prokaryotes, genes controlled by activators have promoters that are unable to strongly bind to RNA polymerase by themselves. Thus, activator proteins help to promote the binding of the RNA polymerase to the promoter. This is done through various mechanisms. Activators may bend the DNA in order to better expose the promoter so the RNA polymerase can bind more effectively. Activators may make direct contact with the RNA polymerase and secure it to the promoter.

===== Eukaryotes =====
In eukaryotes, activators have a variety of different target molecules that they can recruit in order to promote gene transcription. They can recruit other transcription factors and cofactors that are needed in transcription initiation.

Activators can recruit molecules known as coactivators. These coactivator molecules can then perform functions necessary for beginning transcription in place of the activators themselves, such as chromatin modifications.

DNA is much more condensed in eukaryotes; thus, activators tend to recruit proteins that are able to restructure the chromatin so the promoter is more easily accessible by the transcription machinery. Some proteins will rearrange the layout of nucleosomes along the DNA in order to expose the promoter site (ATP-dependent chromatin remodeling complexes). Other proteins affect the binding between histones and DNA via post-translational histone modifications, allowing the DNA tightly wrapped into nucleosomes to loosen.

All of these recruited molecules work together in order to ultimately recruit the RNA polymerase to the promoter site.

==== Release of RNA polymerase ====
Activators can promote gene transcription by signaling the RNA polymerase to move beyond the promoter and proceed along the DNA, initiating the beginning of transcription. The RNA polymerase can sometimes pause shortly after beginning transcription, and activators are required to release RNA polymerase from this "stalled" state. Multiple mechanisms exist for releasing these "stalled" RNA polymerases. Activators may act simply as a signal to trigger the continued movement of the RNA polymerase. If the DNA is too condensed to allow RNA polymerase to continue transcription, activators may recruit proteins that can restructure the DNA so any blocks are removed. Activators may also promote the recruitment of elongation factors, which are necessary for the RNA polymerase to continue transcription.

=== Regulation of activators ===
There are different ways in which the activity of activators themselves can be regulated, in order to ensure that activators are stimulating gene transcription at appropriate times and levels. Activator activity can increase or decrease in response to environmental stimuli or other intracellular signals.

==== Activation of activator proteins ====
Activators often must be "turned on" before they can promote gene transcription. The activity of activators is controlled by the ability of the activator to bind to its regulatory site along the DNA. The DNA-binding domain of the activator has an active form and an inactive form, which are controlled by the binding of molecules known as allosteric effectors to the allosteric site of the activator.

Activators in their inactive form are not bound to any allosteric effectors. When inactive, the activator is unable to bind to its specific regulatory sequence in the DNA, and thus has no regulatory effect on the transcription of genes.

When an allosteric effector binds to the allosteric site of an activator, a conformational change in the DNA-binding domain occurs, which allows the protein to bind to the DNA and increase gene transcription.

==== Post-translational modifications ====
Some activators are able to undergo post-translational modifications that have an effect on their activity within a cell. Processes such as phosphorylation, acetylation, and ubiquitination, among others, have been seen to regulate the activity of activators. Depending on the chemical group being added, as well as the nature of the activator itself, post-translational modifications can either increase or decrease the activity of an activator. For example, acetylation has been seen to increase the activity of some activators through mechanisms such as increasing DNA-binding affinity. On the other hand, ubiquitination decreases the activity of activators, as ubiquitin marks proteins for degradation after they have performed their respective functions.

=== Synergy ===
In prokaryotes, a lone activator protein is able to promote transcription. In eukaryotes, usually more than one activator assembles at the binding-site, forming a complex that acts to promote transcription. These activators bind cooperatively at the binding-site, meaning that the binding of one activator increases the affinity of the site to bind another activator (or in some cases another transcriptional regulator) thus making it easier for multiple activators to bind at the site. In these cases, the activators interact with each other synergistically, meaning that the rate of transcription that is achieved from multiple activators working together is much higher than the additive effects of the activators if they were working individually.

== Examples ==
=== Regulation of maltose catabolism ===
The breakdown of maltose in Escherichia coli is controlled by gene activation. The genes that code for the enzymes responsible for maltose catabolism can only be transcribed in the presence of an activator.The activator that controls transcription of the maltose enzymes is "off" in the absence of maltose. In its inactive form, the activator is unable to bind to DNA and promote transcription of the maltose genes.

When maltose is present in the cell, it binds to the allosteric site of the activator protein, causing a conformational change in the DNA-binding domain of the activator. This conformational change "turns on" the activator by allowing it to bind to its specific regulatory DNA sequence. Binding of the activator to its regulatory site promotes RNA polymerase binding to the promoter and thus transcription, producing the enzymes that are needed to break down the maltose that has entered the cell.

=== Regulation of the lac operon ===
The catabolite activator protein (CAP), otherwise known as cAMP receptor protein (CRP), activates transcription at the lac operon of the bacterium Escherichia coli. Cyclic adenosine monophosphate (cAMP) is produced during glucose starvation; this molecule acts as an allosteric effector that binds to CAP and causes a conformational change that allows CAP to bind to a DNA site located adjacent to the lac promoter. CAP then makes a direct protein–protein interaction with RNA polymerase that recruits RNA polymerase to the lac promoter.

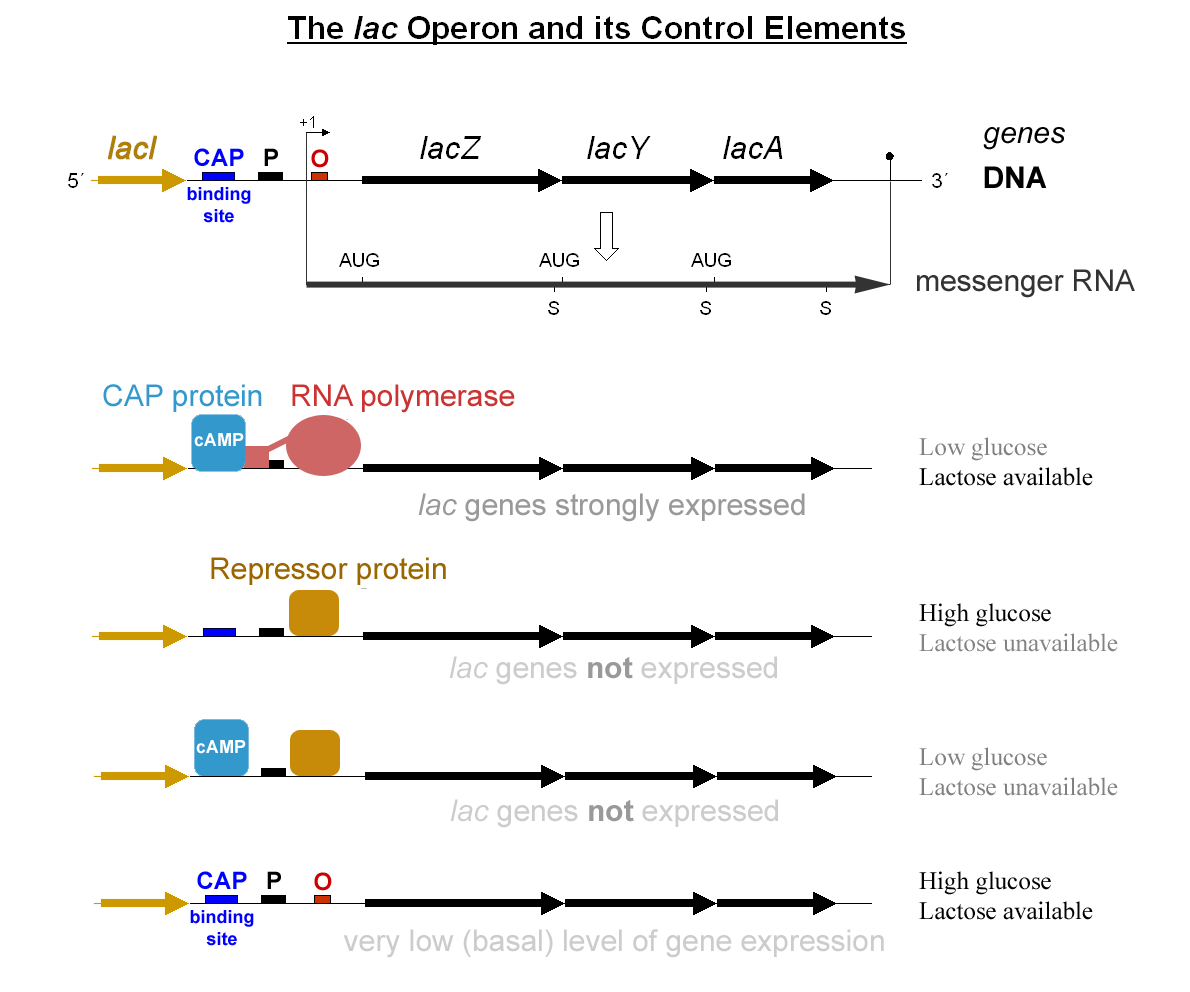
lac operon in detail

== See also ==
- CRISPR activation
- Bacterial transcription
- Coactivator (genetics)
- Eukaryotic transcription
- Glossary of gene expression terms
- Operon
- Promoter (biology)
- Regulation of gene expression
- Repressor
- Squelching
- Transcription factor
