= Pho4 =

Protein-coding gene in yeast

Phosphate system positive regulatory protein PHO4
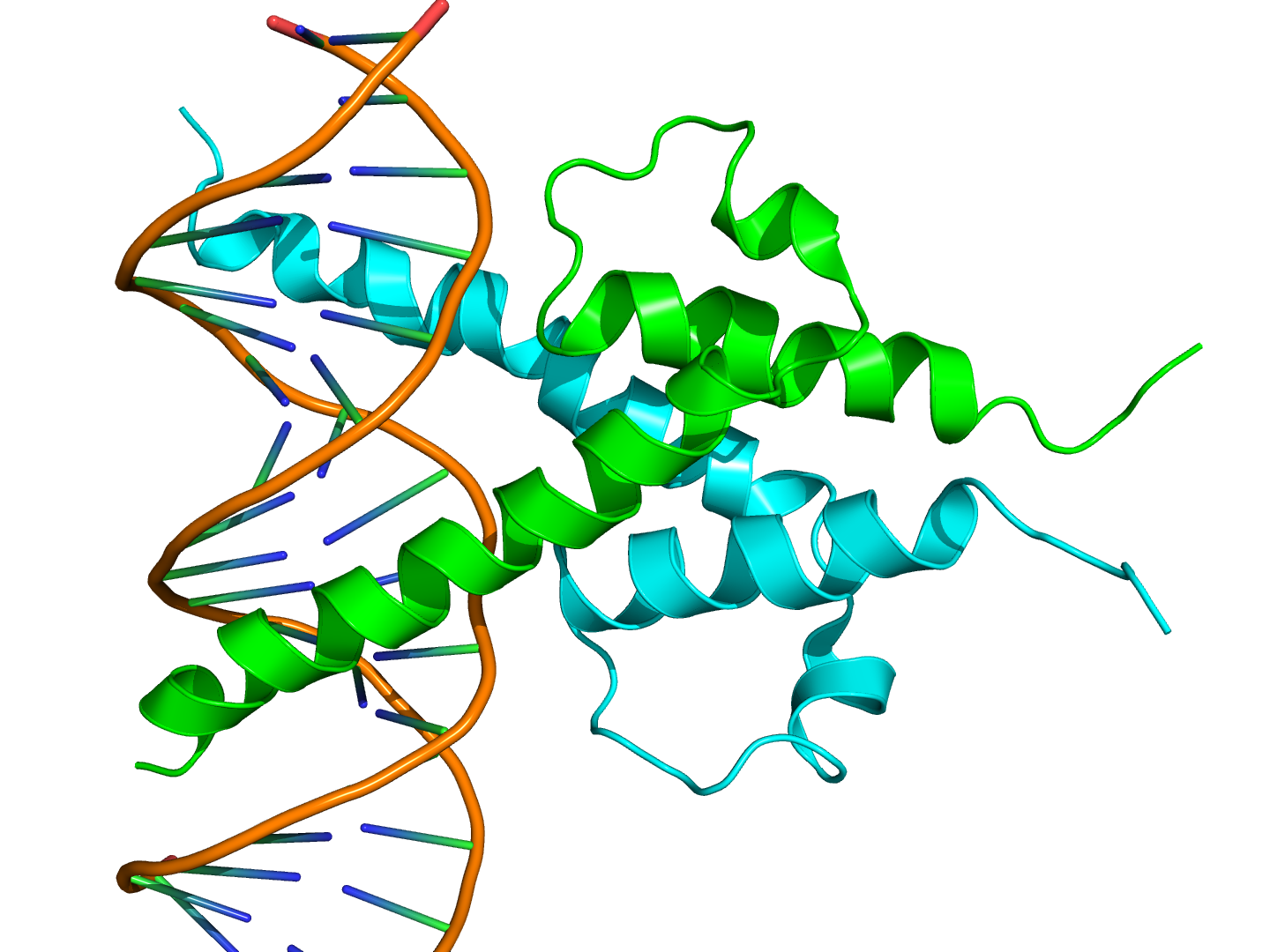
- Crystallographic structure of yeast Pho4 homodimer (cyan and green) complexed with DNA (brown).

Identifiers
- Organism: Saccharomyces cerevisiae (Baker's yeast)
- Symbol: PHO4
- Alt. symbols: YFR034C
- Entrez: 850594
- Orthologs: NCBI: entry; OMA: entry
- PDB: 1A0A, 3W3X, 9D45
- RefSeq (mRNA): NM_001179999
- RefSeq (Prot): NP_116692
- UniProt: P07270

Other data
- Chromosome: VI: 0.23 - 0.23 Mb
Search for
- Structures: Swiss-model
- Domains: InterPro

Pho4 is a protein with a basic helix-loop-helix (bHLH) transcription factor. It is found in S. cerevisiae and other yeasts. It functions as a transcription factor to regulate phosphate responsive genes located in yeast cells. The Pho4 protein homodimer is able to do this by binding to DNA sequences containing the bHLH binding site 5'-CACGTG-3'. This sequence is found in the promoters of genes up-regulated in response to phosphate availability such as the PHO5 gene.

== Structure ==
Helical regions are represented by ribbons; non-regular secondary structure elements by thin tubes. Molecules A and B are colored cyan and lime-green, respectively. Helical structure is clearly seen in the loop region. The PHO4 protein consists of 312 amino acid residues (Yoshida et al., 1989) and has four functional domains. PHO4 is one of the regulatory proteins indispensable for transcription of the PHO5, PHO81 and PHO84 genes. The DNA-binding domain of PHO4 consists of two helices, designated H1 and H2, separated by a long loop that contains a novel α-helical region. PHO4 binds to DNA as a homodimer and the two monomers fold into a parallel, left-handed four-helix bundle. PHO4 protein lacks an inner hydrogen network.

== Mechanism ==
Pho4 is a transcription factor that assists in regulating cell growth. When activated, Pho4 is translocated to the nucleus. Pho4 has a Nuclear Exchange factor that an importin protein is able to bind to. The importin protein will bind to its "signal" or nuclear exchange factor and aid in translocating the nuclear exchange factor tagged protein into the nucleus. Additionally, another transcription factor known as Pho2, binds to Pho4 and assists in Pho4's ability to bind tightly to its binding site on its specific target genes. This completes the addition of the binding partners that Pho4 needs in order to be capable of acting as a transcription factor by up-regulating the transcription of phosphate-responsive genes.

== Regulation ==
=== Suppression ===
Down regulation of the transcription factor Pho4 is seen when the yeast cell has a phosphate rich environment. Under high phosphate concentrations, it is seen that a cyclin-dependent kinase, known as PHO80-PHO50, phosphorylates PHO4 on its serine residues (O’Neil et al. 209–212). This blocks the binding sites for the importin and Pho2 transcription factor and allows for the receptor Msn5p to assist in the removal of the Pho4 protein from the nucleus and back into the cytoplasmic space. Additionally, because the binding site of importin on the Pho4 protein is blocked from the phosphorylation that PHO4 undergoes, PHO4 is no longer able to be translocated into the nucleus.

=== Up-regulation ===
Up-regulation of Pho4 is seen in phosphate deficient yeast cells. This occurs due to cyclin dependent kinase PHO80-PHO85 being inhibited by the cyclin dependent inhibitor PHO81. In low concentrations of phosphate the CDK inhibitor PHO80-PHO85 is able to inhibit PHO80-PHO85 from phosphorylating PHO4 at its serine residues. When this occurs, importin and PHO2 are able to bind to PHO4 and assist in the translocation and tight binding to its binding site on the gene PHO5 which will then become up-regulated.
