= Gal4 transcription factor =

Regulatory protein GAL4

Identifiers
- Organism: Saccharomyces cerevisiae
- Symbol: GAL4
- Entrez: 855828
- Orthologs: NCBI: entry; OMA: entry
- UniProt: P04386
Search for
- Structures: Swiss-model
- Domains: InterPro

The Gal4 transcription factor is a positive regulator of gene expression of galactose-induced genes. This protein represents a large fungal family of transcription factors, Gal4 family, which includes over 50 members in the yeast Saccharomyces cerevisiae e.g. Oaf1, Pip2, Pdr1, Pdr3, Leu3.

Gal4 recognizes genes with UAS_{G}, an upstream activating sequence, and activates them. In yeast cells, the principal targets are GAL1 (galactokinase), GAL10 (UDP-glucose 4-epimerase), and GAL7 (galactose-1-phosphate uridylyltransferase), three enzymes required for galactose metabolism. This binding has also proven useful in constructing the GAL4/UAS system, a technique for controlling expression in insects. In yeast, Gal4 is by default repressed by Gal80, and activated in the presence of galactose as Gal3 binds away Gal80.

== Domains ==
Two executive domains, DNA binding and activation domains, provide key function of the Gal4 protein conforming to most of the transcription factors.

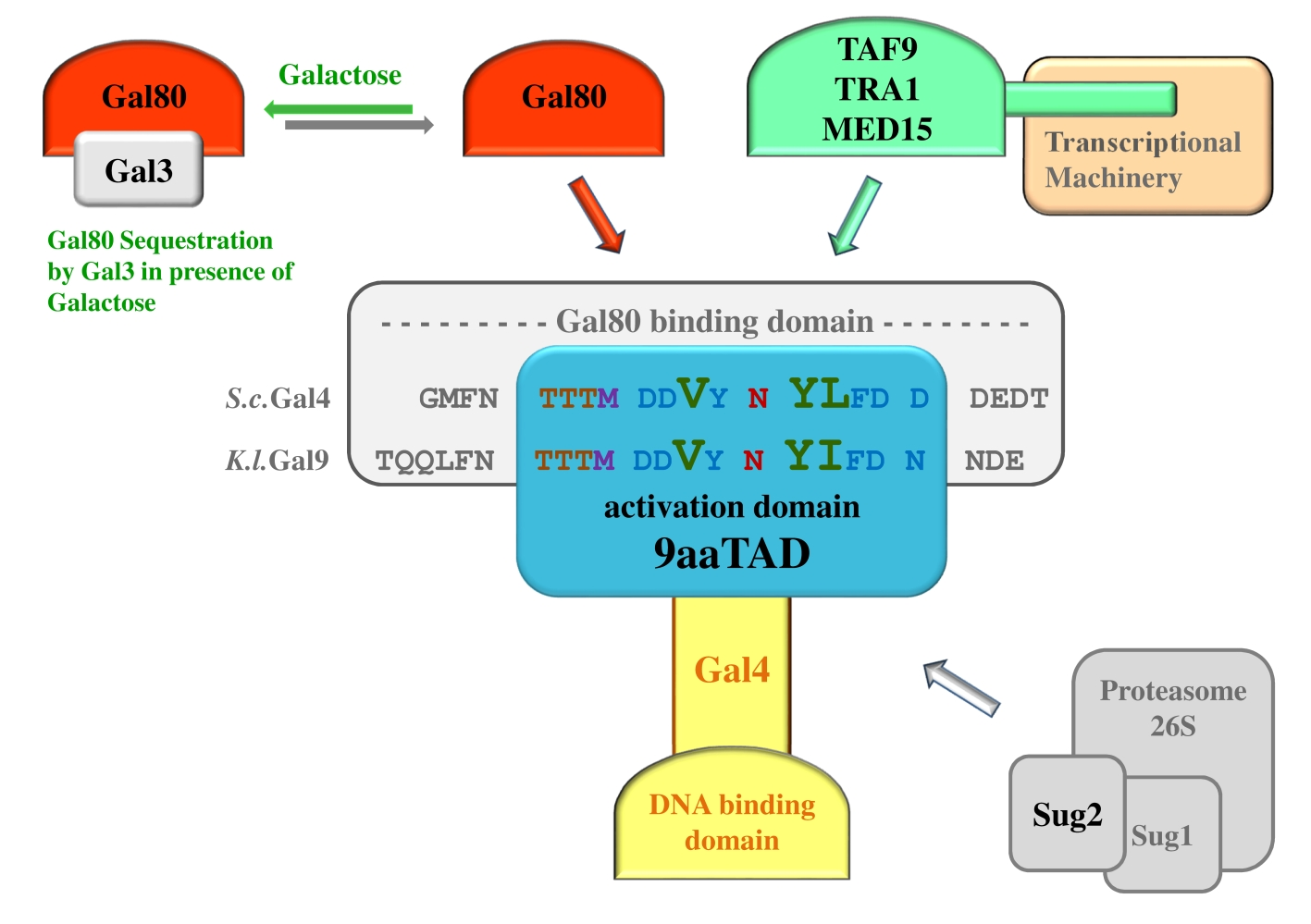
Gal4 domains and regulation

=== DNA binding ===
Gal4 N-terminus is a zinc finger and belongs to the Zn(2)-C6 fungal family. It forms a Zn – cysteines thiolate cluster, and specifically recognizes UAS_{G} in GAL1 promoter.

=== Gal4 transactivation ===
Localised to the C-terminus, belongs to the nine amino acids transactivation domain family, 9aaTAD, together with Oaf1, Pip2, Pdr1, Pdr3, but also p53, E2A, MLL.

== Regulation ==
Galactose induces Gal4 mediated transcription albeit Glucose causes severe repression.

As a part of the Gal4 regulation, inhibitory protein Gal80 recognises and binds to the Gal4 region (853-874 aa).

The inhibitory protein Gal80 is sequestered by regulatory protein Gal3 in Galactose dependent manner. This allows for Gal4 to work when there is galactose.

=== Mutants ===
The Gal4 loss-of-function mutant gal4-64 (1-852 aa, deletion of the Gal4 C-terminal 29 aa) lost both interaction with Gal80 and activation function.

In the Gal4 reverted mutant Gal4C-62 mutant, a sequence (QTAY N AFMN) with the 9aaTAD pattern emerged and restored activation function of the Gal4 protein.

=== Inactive constructs ===
The activation domain Gal4 is inhibited by C-terminal domain in some Gal4 constructs.

== Function ==
=== Transcription ===
The Gal4 activation function is mediated by MED15 (Gal11).

The Gal4 protein interacts also with other mediators of transcription as are Tra1, TAF9, and SAGA/MED15 complex.

=== Proteosome ===
A subunit of the 26 S proteasome Sug2 regulatory protein has a molecular and functional interaction with Gal4 function. Proteolytic turnover of the Gal4 transcription factor is not required for function in vivo. The native Gal4 monoubiquitination protects from 19S-mediated destabilizing under inducing conditions.

== Application ==
The broad use of the Gal4 is in yeast two-hybrid screening to screen or to assay protein-protein interactions in eukaryotic cells from yeast to human.

In the GAL4/UAS system, the Gal4 protein and Gal4 upstream activating region (UAS) are used to study the gene expression and function in organisms such as the fruit fly.

The Gal4 and inhibitory protein Gal80 have found application in a genetics technique for creating individually labeled homozygous cells called MARCM (Mosaic analysis with a repressible cell marker).

== See also ==
- lac operon
