= Bosguérard-de-Marcouville =

- Part of Les Monts du Roumois
- Location of Bosguérard-de-Marcouville
- Location within France Location within Normandy
- Coordinates: 49°16′45″N 0°51′06″E
- Country: France
- Region: Normandy
- Department: Eure
- Arrondissement: Bernay
- Canton: Bourgtheroulde-Infreville
- Commune: Les Monts du Roumois
- Area^{1}: 12 km^{2} (4.6 sq mi)
- Elevation: 136 m (446 ft)
- Highest elevation: 173 m (568 ft)
- Lowest elevation: 98 m (322 ft)
- Population (2023): 651
  - Density: 54/km^{2} (140/sq mi)
- Time zone: UTC+01:00 (CET)
  - Summer (DST): UTC+02:00 (CEST)
- Postal code: 27520
- ^{1} French Land Register data, which excludes lakes, ponds, glaciers > 1 km^{2} (0.386 sq mi or 247 acres) and river estuaries.

Bosguérard-de-Marcouville (French pronunciation: [boɡeʁaʁ də maʁkuvil]) is a former commune in the Eure department in Normandy in northern France. On 1 January 2017, it was merged into the new commune Les Monts du Roumois.

== History ==
The commune is located in the countryside of the Roumois. It was created in 1844 from the union of Marcouville-en-Roumois and Saint-Denis-du-Bosguérard.

== See also ==
- Communes of the Eure department
