= MED15 =

Protein-coding gene in the species Homo sapiens

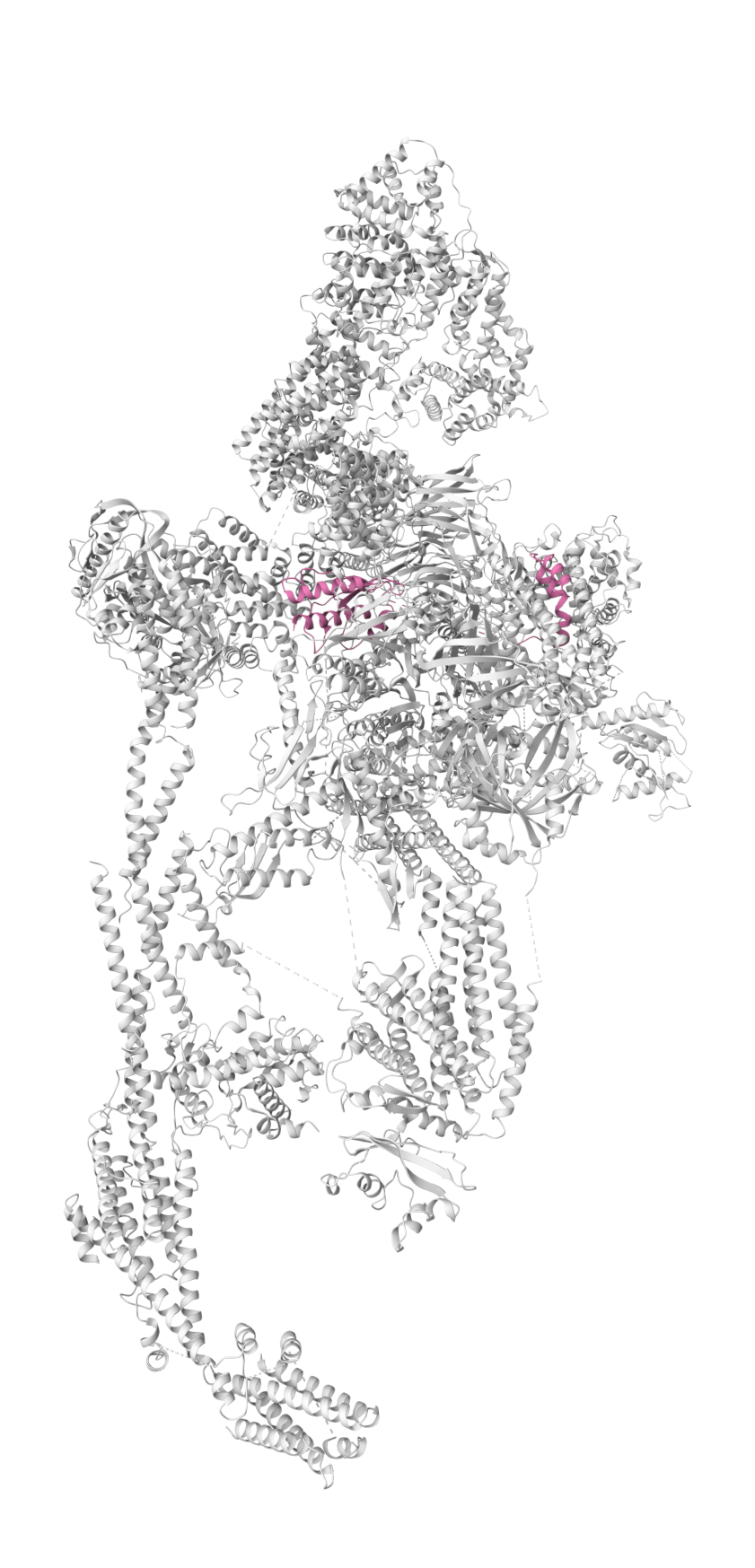

Identifiers
- Aliases: MED15, ARC105, CAG7A, CTG7A, PCQAP, TIG-1, TIG1, TNRC7, mediator complex subunit 15
- External IDs: OMIM: 607372; MGI: 2137379; GeneCards: MED15
Available structures
PDB	Ortholog search: PDBe RCSB
PDB	List of PDB id codes 2GUT

Gene location (Human)
Chr.	Chromosome 22 (human)
Band	22q11.21	Start	20,495,913 bp
Band	22q11.21	End	20,587,632 bp

Gene location (Mouse)
Chr.	Chromosome 16 (mouse)
Band	16 A3|16 10.94 cM	Start	17,469,072 bp
Band	16 A3|16 10.94 cM	End	17,550,755 bp
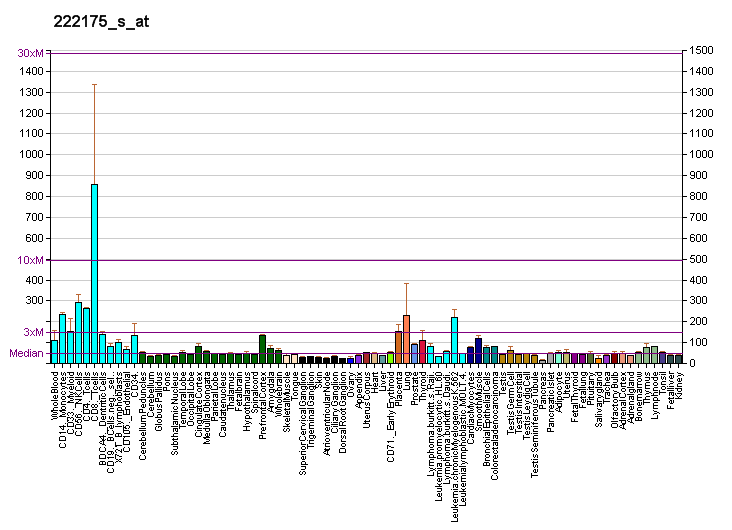
RNA expression pattern
Bgee	Human / Mouse (ortholog); Top expressed in: sural nerve; granulocyte; left adrenal gland; right adrenal gland; left adrenal cortex; upper lobe of left lung; popliteal artery; tibial arteries; right adrenal cortex; body of uterus / Top expressed in: zygote; secondary oocyte; genital tubercle; tail of embryo; superior frontal gyrus; neural layer of retina; primary visual cortex; dentate gyrus of hippocampal formation granule cell; granulocyte; lip; More reference expression data
BioGPS	More reference expression data
Gene ontology
Molecular function	transcription coregulator activity; protein binding
Cellular component	cytoplasm; mediator complex; membrane; nucleus; nucleoplasm
Biological process	regulation of transcription by RNA polymerase II; transcription initiation from RNA polymerase II promoter; regulation of transcription, DNA-templated; transcription, DNA-templated; stem cell population maintenance
Sources:Amigo / QuickGO
Orthologs
Databases	NCBI: entry; OMA: entry
Species	Human	Mouse
Entrez	51586	94112
Ensembl	ENSG00000099917	ENSMUSG00000012114
UniProt	Q96RN5	Q924H2
RefSeq (mRNA)	NM_001003891; NM_001293234; NM_001293235; NM_001293236; NM_001293237 NM_015889	NM_001040683; NM_001285884; NM_001285886; NM_033609; NM_001358404
RefSeq (protein)	NP_001003891; NP_001280163; NP_001280164; NP_001280165; NP_001280166 NP_056973	NP_001035773; NP_001272813; NP_001272815; NP_001345333; NP_291087
Location (UCSC)	Chr 22: 20.5 – 20.59 Mb	Chr 16: 17.47 – 17.55 Mb
PubMed search
- Wikidata
View/Edit Human	View/Edit Mouse

Mediator of RNA polymerase II transcription subunit 15, also known as Gal11, Spt13 in yeast and PCQAP, ARC105, or TIG-1 in humans is a protein encoded by the MED15 gene.

== Function ==
MED15 is a general transcriptional cofactor of the mediator complex involved in RNA polymerase II dependent transcription, originally called Gal11 and Spt13 and found in yeast as an essential factor for Gal4 dependent transactivation by T.Fukasawa and F.Winston labs. Transcription factors Gcn4, Pho4, Msn2, Ino2, members of the Gal4 family - Gal4, Oaf1, Pdr1, and viral VP16 have been reported to interact with yeast MED15.

Most of these transcription factors share the same transactivation domain, 9aaTAD, which directly interacts with KIX domain of the MED15.

Furthermore, human MED15 cooperates in mediator complex (previously known as PC2, ARC, or DRIP) with transcription factors like VP16 and SREBP. Human SREBP regulates sterol responsive gene expression, and this regulatory action is conserved in the genetic model organism C. elegans, a roundworm (homologues MDT-15 and SBP-1). Also in C. elegans, MDT-15 is essential for the response to several stresses (fasting, heavy metal, toxin, and oxidative stress); at least in part the fasting response is conferred by interactions of MDT-15 with nuclear receptors, including NHR-49.

== Gene ==
The MED15 gene contains stretches of trinucleotide repeats and is located in the chromosome 22 region which is deleted in DiGeorge's syndrome. Two transcript variants encoding different isoforms have been found for this gene.
