= Berville-en-Roumois =

- Part of Les Monts du Roumois
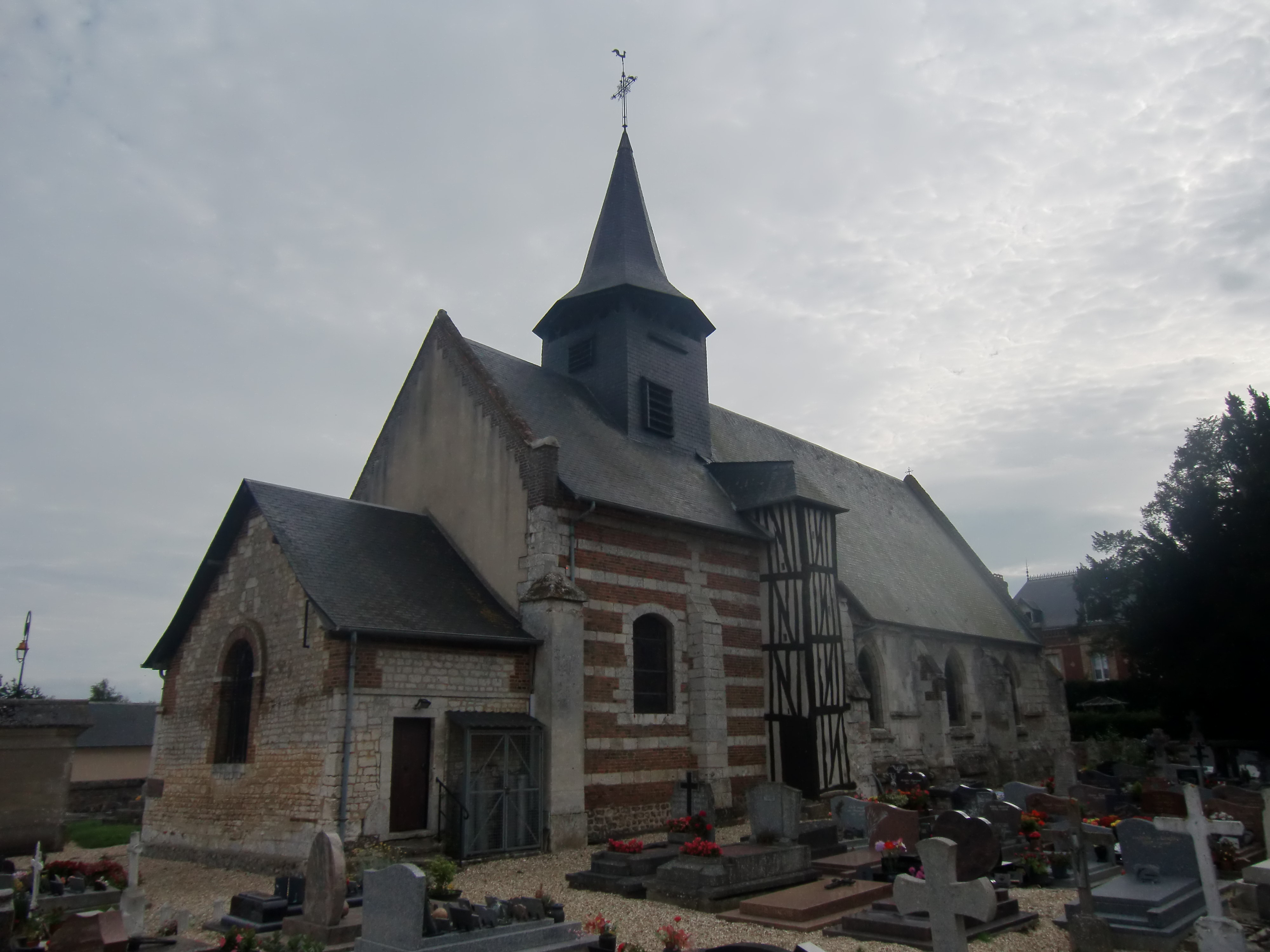
- Location of Berville-en-Roumois
- Location within France Location within Normandy
- Coordinates: 49°17′48″N 0°49′24″E
- Country: France
- Region: Normandy
- Department: Eure
- Arrondissement: Bernay
- Canton: Bourgtheroulde-Infreville
- Commune: Les Monts du Roumois
- Area^{1}: 9.25 km^{2} (3.57 sq mi)
- Elevation: 144 m (472 ft)
- Highest elevation: 149 m (489 ft)
- Lowest elevation: 98 m (322 ft)
- Population (2023): 896
  - Density: 96.9/km^{2} (251/sq mi)
- Time zone: UTC+01:00 (CET)
  - Summer (DST): UTC+02:00 (CEST)
- Postal code: 27520
- ^{1} French Land Register data, which excludes lakes, ponds, glaciers > 1 km^{2} (0.386 sq mi or 247 acres) and river estuaries.

Berville-en-Roumois (French pronunciation: [bɛʁvil ɑ̃ ʁumwa], literally Berville in Roumois) is a former commune in the Eure department in Normandy in northern France. On 1 January 2017, it was merged into the new commune Les Monts du Roumois.

== See also ==
- Communes of the Eure department
