= Upstream activating sequence =

An upstream activating sequence or upstream activation sequence (UAS) is a cis-acting regulatory sequence found in yeast like Saccharomyces cerevisiae. It is distinct from the promoter and increases the expression of a neighbouring gene. Due to its essential role in activating transcription, the upstream activating sequence is often considered to be analogous to the function of the enhancer in multicellular eukaryotes. Upstream activation sequences are a crucial part of induction, enhancing the expression of the protein of interest through increased transcriptional activity. The upstream activation sequence is found adjacently upstream to a minimal promoter (TATA box) and serves as a binding site for transactivators. If the transcriptional transactivator does not bind to the UAS in the proper orientation then transcription cannot begin. To further understand the function of an upstream activation sequence, it is beneficial to see its role in the cascade of events that lead to transcription activation. The pathway begins when activators bind to their target at the UAS recruiting a mediator. A TATA-binding protein subunit of a transcription factor then binds to the TATA box, recruiting additional transcription factors. The mediator then recruits RNA polymerase II to the pre-initiation complex. Once initiated, RNA polymerase II is released from the complex and transcription begins.

== Examples ==
=== GAL1-GAL10 intergenic region (UAS_{G}) ===
The property of the GAL1-GAL10 to bind the GAL4 protein is utilised in the GAL4/UAS technique for controlled gene mis-expression in Drosophila. This is the most popular form of binary expression in Drosophila melanogaster, a system which has been adapted for many uses to make Drosophila melanogaster one of the most genetically tractable multicellular organisms. In this technique, four related binding sites between the GAL10 and GAL1 loci in Saccharomyces cerevisiae serve as an Upstream Activating Sequences (UAS) element through GAL4 binding. Several studies have been conducted with Saccharomyces cerevisiae to explore the exact function of upstream activation sequences, often focusing on the aforementioned GAL1-GAL10 intergenic region. The consensus is 5′-CGG-N_{11}-CCG-3′.

One study explored the galactose-responsive upstream activation sequence (UAS_{G}), looking at the influence of proximity to this UAS for nucleosome positioning. Proximity to the UAS was chosen because deletions of DNA flanking the UAS left the nucleosome array unaltered, indicating that nucleosome positioning was not related to sequence-specific histone-DNA interactions. The role of specific regions of UAS_{G} was analyzed by inserting oligonucleotides with different binding properties, leading to the successful identification of a region responsible for the creation of an ordered array. The sequence identified overlapped a binding site for GAL4 protein, which is a positive regulator for transcription which coincides with the function of upstream activating sequences.

Another study looked at the effect of inserting the UAS_{G} into the promoter region of the glyceraldehyde-3-phosphate dehydrogenase gene (GPD) . This hybrid promoter was then utilized to express human immune interferon, a toxic substance to yeast that results in a reduced copy number and low plasmid stability. Relative to the native promoter, expression of the hybrid promoter was induced roughly 150- to 200-fold in the cultures by growth in galactose, induction that wasn't apparent with glucose as the carbon source. When compared to the native GPD promoter, the presence of UAS_{G} caused the transcriptional activity to remain equivalently enhanced under induced conditions.

=== Inositol-sensitive upstream activation sequence (UAS_{INO}) ===
The inositol-sensitive upstream activation sequence (UAS_{INO}) has a consensus sequence 5'-CATGTGAAAT-3' and is present in the promoter regions of genes that encode enzymes of phospholipid biosynthesis. These enzymes are regulated by inositol and choline, both of which are phospholipid precursors. Within this consensus sequence, the first six bases are homologous with canonical binding motif for proteins within the bHLH or the basic helix-loop-helix family. Studies have shown that Ino2p and Ino4p, two bHLH regulatory proteins from Saccharomyces cerevisiae, bind to promoter fragments containing this element of the consensus sequence. Additional studies have been designed to explore the function of UAS_{INO} in more detail largely in part because a large number of phospholipid biosynthetic enzyme activities in the model organism Saccharomyces cerevisiae show this common pattern of expression.

One study explored the interaction between Ino4p and Ino2p in more depth, examining the dimerization that takes place between the two prior to binding to the promoter of the INO1 gene and activating transcription. By isolating 31 recessive suppressors of the ino4-8 mutant of yeast and determining that 29 were of the same locus, the researchers identified the locus as REG1 . One allele of REG1, the suppressor mutant sia1-1, was capable of suppressing the inositol auxotrophy, revealing a possible pathway for the repression of inositol-sensitive upstream activating sequence-containing genes of yeast.
