= P300-CBP coactivator family =

Protein family

E1A binding protein p300
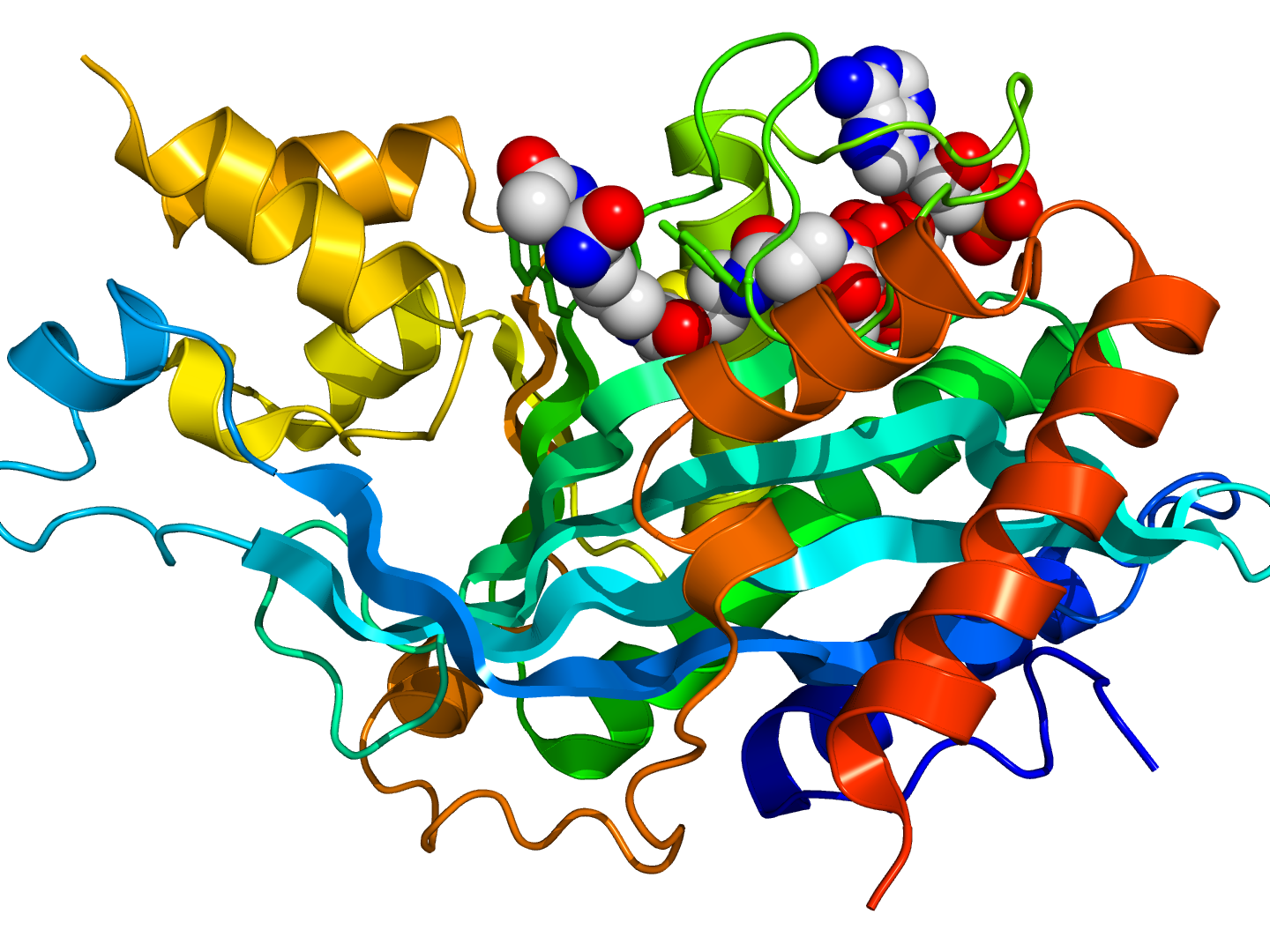
- Crystallographic structure of the histone acetyltransferase domain of EP300 (rainbow colored, N-terminus = blue, C-terminus = red) complexed with the inhibitor lysine-CoA (space-filling model, carbon = white, oxygen = red, nitrogen = blue, phosphorus = orange).

Identifiers
- Symbol: EP300
- Alt. symbols: p300
- NCBI gene: 2033
- HGNC: 3373
- OMIM: 602700
- PDB: 3biy
- RefSeq: NM_001429
- UniProt: Q09472

Other data
- EC number: 2.3.1.48
- Locus: Chr. 22 q13.2
Search for
- Structures: Swiss-model
- Domains: InterPro

CREB binding protein (CBP)
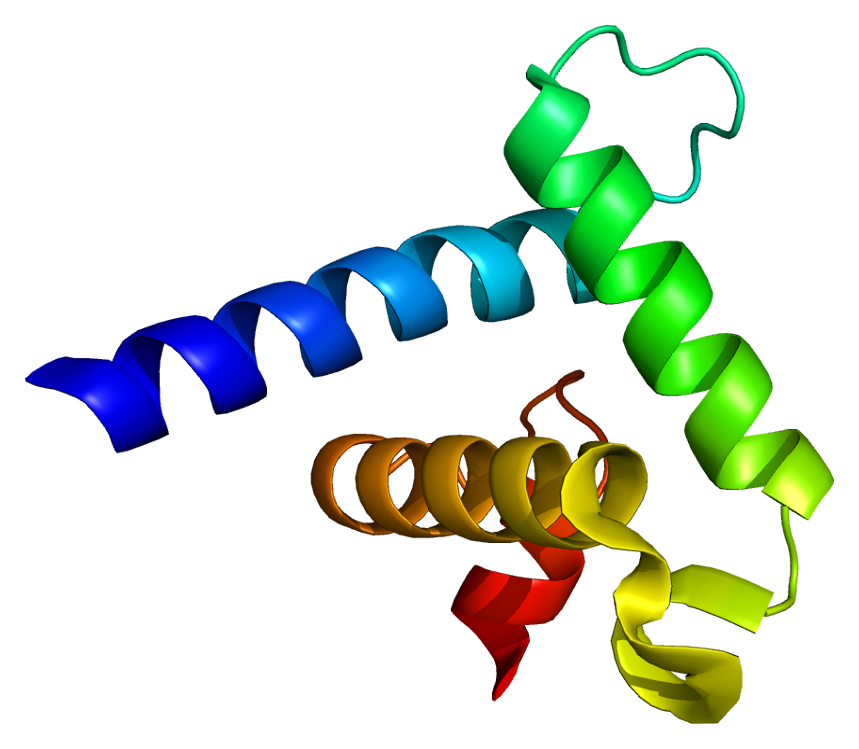
- Structure of the TAZ2 domain (amino acids 1764–1850) of the mouse CREBBP protein. Based on PyMOL rendering of the structure PDB 1f81

Identifiers
- Symbol: CREBBP
- Alt. symbols: CBP, RSTS
- NCBI gene: 1387
- HGNC: 2348
- OMIM: 600140
- PDB: 3dwy
- RefSeq: NM_004380
- UniProt: Q92793

Other data
- EC number: 2.3.1.48
- Locus: Chr. 16 p13.3
Search for
- Structures: Swiss-model
- Domains: InterPro

The p300-CBP coactivator family in humans is composed of two closely related transcriptional co-activating proteins (or coactivators):

1. p300 (also known as E1A binding protein p300, is encoded by the EP300 gene)
2. CBP (also known as CREB-binding protein encoded by the CREBBP)

Both p300 and CBP interact with numerous transcription factors and act to increase the expression of their target genes.

== Protein structure ==
p300 and CBP have similar structures. Both contain five protein interaction domains: the nuclear receptor interaction domain (RID), the KIX domain (CREB and MYB interaction domain), the cysteine/histidine regions (TAZ1/CH1 and TAZ2/CH3) and the interferon response binding domain (IBiD). These domains contain histone acetyltransferase that help regulate gene expression, by acetylating histones and other proteins. These proteins also contain a bromodomain that can recognize the acetylated lysines and a PHD finger domain; therefore promoting transcription. The conserved domains are connected by long stretches of unstructured linkers.The last four domains, KIX, TAZ1, TAZ2 and IBiD of p300, each bind tightly to a sequence spanning both transactivation domains 9aaTADs of transcription factor p53.Nine-amino-acid transactivation domains, or 9aaTADs, are transcriptional activation motifs found in several transcription factors and are relevant to p300/CBP interactions with proteins such as p53.

Organization of the p300-CBP coactivator family, protein-interaction between domains and functional regions.

== Regulation of gene expression ==
p300 and CBP are thought to increase gene expression in three ways:

1. The intrinsic histone acetyltransferase activity can relax the chromatin structure at the gene promoter.
2. Help recruit components of the basal transcriptional machinery including RNA polymerase II to the promoter.
3. Act as adaptor molecules and connect transcription factors with transcriptional machinery.

p300 regulates transcription by directly binding to transcription factors (see external reference for explanatory image). This interaction is managed by one or more of the p300 domains: the nuclear receptor interaction domain (RID), the CREB and MYB interaction domain (KIX), the cysteine/histidine regions (TAZ1/CH1 and TAZ2/CH3) and the interferon response binding domain (IBiD).

Enhancer regions, which regulate gene transcription, are known to be bound by p300 and CBP, and ChIP-seq for these proteins has been used to predict enhancers.

Work done by Heintzman and colleagues showed that 70% of the p300 binding occurs in open chromatin regions as seen by the association with DNase I hypersensitive sites. Furthermore, they have described that most p300 binding (75%) occurs far away from transcription start sites (TSSs) and these binding sites are also associated with enhancer regions as seen by H3K4me1 enrichment. They have also found some correlation between p300 and RNAPII binding at enhancers, which can be explained by the physical interaction with promoters or by enhancer RNAs.

== Function in G protein signaling ==
An example of a process involving p300 and CBP is G protein signaling. Some G proteins stimulate adenylate cyclase that results in elevation of cAMP. cAMP stimulates PKA, which consists of four subunits, two regulatory and two catalytic(R and C subunits) tagged together when inactive. Binding of 4 cAMP to the R(Regulatory)subunit causes release and activation of the C(catalytic) subunits. These subunits can then enter the nucleus to interact with transcriptional factors, thus affecting gene transcription. The transcription factor CREB, which interacts with a DNA sequence called a cAMP response element (or CRE), is phosphorylated on a serine (Ser 133) in the KID domain. This modification is PKA mediated, and promotes the interaction of the KID domain of CREB with the KIX domain of CBP or p300 and enhances transcription of CREB target genes, including genes that aid gluconeogenesis. This pathway can be initiated by adrenaline activating β-adrenergic receptors on the cell surface.

== Clinical significance and targets ==
Mutations in CBP, and to a lesser extent p300, are the cause of Rubinstein-Taybi Syndrome, which is characterized by severe intellectual disability. These mutations result in the loss of one copy of the gene in each cell, which reduces the amount of CBP or p300 protein by half. Some mutations lead to the production of a very short, nonfunctional version of the CBP or p300 protein, while others prevent one copy of the gene from making any protein at all. Although researchers do not know how a reduction in the amount of CBP or p300 protein leads to the specific features of Rubinstein-Taybi syndrome, it is clear that the loss of one copy of the CBP or p300 gene disrupts normal development.

Defects in CBP HAT activity appear to cause problems in long-term memory formation.

CBP and p300 have also been found to be involved in multiple rare chromosomal translocations that are associated with acute myeloid leukemia. For example, researchers have found a translocation between chromosomes 8 and 22 (in the region containing the p300 gene) in several people with a cancer of blood cells called acute myeloid leukemia (AML). Another translocation, involving chromosomes 11 and 22, has been found in a small number of people who have undergone cancer treatment. This chromosomal change is associated with the development of AML following chemotherapy for other forms of cancer.

Mutations in the p300 gene have been identified in several other types of cancer. These mutations are somatic, which means they are acquired during a person's lifetime and are present only in certain cells. Somatic mutations in the p300 gene have been found in a small number of solid tumors, including cancers of the colon and rectum, stomach, breast and pancreas. Studies suggest that p300 mutations may also play a role in the development of some prostate cancers, and could help predict whether these tumors will increase in size or spread to other parts of the body. In cancer cells, p300 mutations prevent the gene from producing any functional protein. Without p300, cells cannot effectively restrain growth and division, which can allow cancerous tumors to form. Due to this unique characteristic of p300, there are studies about CBP/p300 as possible drug targets in cancer. Small-molecule inhibitors have been developed to target either the histone acetyltransferase catalytic domain or the bromodomain of CBP/p300. One example is A-485, a selective catalytic inhibitor of p300/CBP that competes with acetyl-CoA and has been used to study tumor-cell dependence on CBP/p300 acetyltransferase activity. Other CBP/p300 inhibitors, including bromodomain inhibitors have been investigated in preclinical cancer models, and has potential to advance into clinical trials.

== Mouse models ==
CBP and p300 are critical for normal embryonic development, as mice completely lacking either of these proteins die at an early embryonic stage. Loss of p300 in a mouse causes developmental and proliferaion defects and reduced dosage of both p300 and CBP is associated with early embryonic lethality. In addition, mice which lack one functional copy (allele) of both the CBP and p300 genes (i.e. are heterozygous for both CBP and p300), and thus have half of the normal amount of both CBP and p300, also die early in embryogenesis. This indicates that the total amount of CBP and p300 protein is critical for embryo development. Data suggest that some cell types can tolerate loss of CBP or p300 better than the whole organism can. In mouse lymphocytes, studies show that loss of either CBP or p300 can be partially tolerated, but total loss of both proteins dirsupts T-Cell and B-Cell development.. Together, the data indicate that, while individual cell types require different amounts of CBP and p300 to develop or survive and some cell types are more tolerant of loss of CBP or p300 than the whole organism, it appears that many, if not all cell types may require at least some p300 or CBP to develop.
