= Herpes simplex virus protein vmw65 =

Alpha trans-inducing protein (Alpha-TIF)
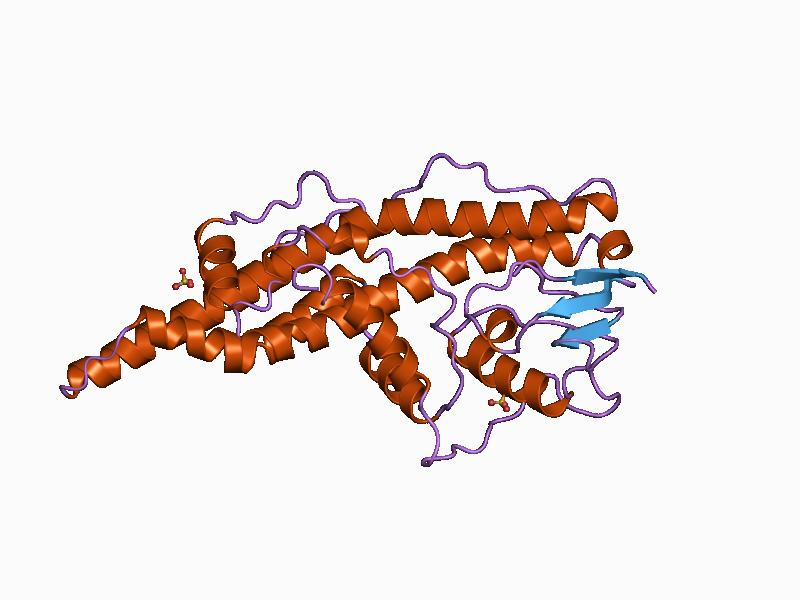
- Structure of the conserved core of the herpes simplex virus transcriptional regulatory protein VP16.

Identifiers
- Symbol: Alpha_TIF
- Pfam: PF02232
- InterPro: IPR003174
- SMART: SM00814
- SCOP2: 16vp / SCOPe / SUPFAM
Available protein structures:
- PDB: 16vp IPR003174 PF02232 (ECOD; PDBsum)
- AlphaFold: IPR003174; PF02232

Vmw65, also known as VP16 or α-TIF (Trans Inducing Factor) is a trans-acting protein that forms a complex with the host transcription factors Oct-1 and HCF to induce immediate early gene transcription in the herpes simplex viruses.

VP16 is a strong transactivator and is often used in Y2H systems as the activation domain of the system.
