= Berville-la-Campagne =

- Commune
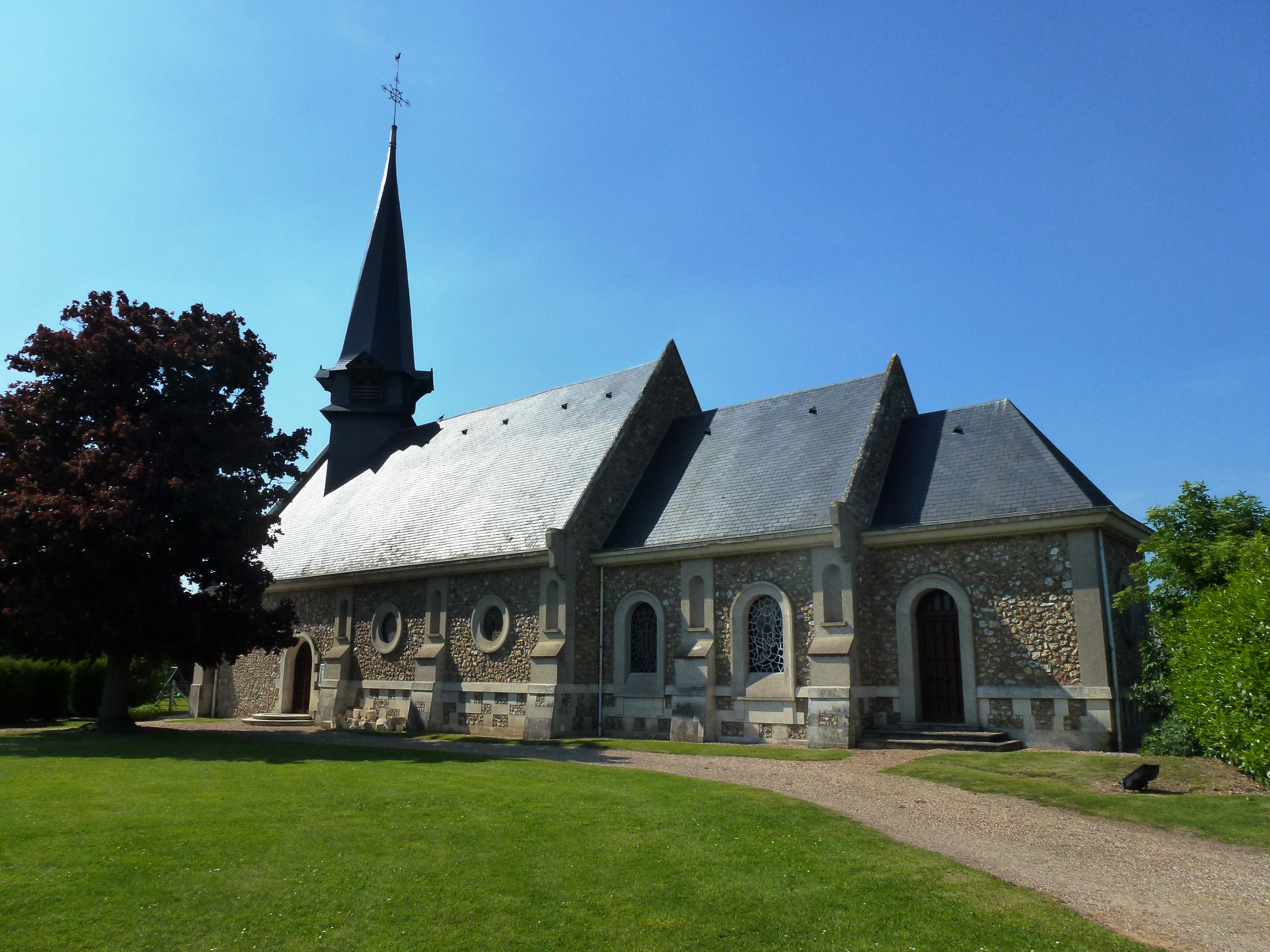
- The church in Berville-la-Campagne

- Coat of arms
- Location of Berville-la-Campagne
- Location within France Location within Normandy
- Coordinates: 49°01′38″N 0°54′06″E
- Country: France
- Region: Normandy
- Department: Eure
- Arrondissement: Bernay
- Canton: Brionne

Government
  - Mayor (2020–2026): Gérard Leloup
- Area^{1}: 8.68 km^{2} (3.35 sq mi)
- Elevation: 120 m (390 ft)
- Highest elevation: 159 m (522 ft)
- Lowest elevation: 141 m (463 ft)
- Population (2023): 270
  - Density: 31/km^{2} (81/sq mi)
- Time zone: UTC+01:00 (CET)
  - Summer (DST): UTC+02:00 (CEST)
- INSEE/Postal code: 27063 /27170
- ^{1} French Land Register data, which excludes lakes, ponds, glaciers > 1 km^{2} (0.386 sq mi or 247 acres) and river estuaries.

Berville-la-Campagne is a commune in the Eure department in Normandy in northern France.

== Population ==
Historical population
Year	Pop.	±% p.a.
1968	117	—
1975	152	+3.81%
1982	147	−0.48%
1990	131	−1.43%
1999	113	−1.63%
2007	140	+2.71%
2012	194	+6.74%
2017	245	+4.78%
2023	270	+1.63%
Source: INSEE

== See also ==
- Communes of the Eure department
