= Gcn4 =

Fungal protein found in Saccharomyces cerevisiae S288c

Gcn4 is a transcription factor and a “master regulator” for gene expression which regulates close to one tenth of the yeast genome. In a study by Razaghi et al, amino acid starvation activated the transcription factor Gcn4p, resulting in transcriptional induction of almost all genes involved in amino acid biosynthesis, including HIS4. The activation of GCN4 itself during starvation uses upstream open reading frames (uORFs). During starvation, the availability of the eIF2 ternary complex is reduced, allowing translation of the main ORF and skipping the upstream ORF. The involvement of Gcn4 in regulation of both histidinol dehydrogenase HIS4 and interferon gamma hIFNγ was hypothesised as a scenario explaining the increased level of hIFNγ under amino acid starvation.

Overexpression of Gcn4 leads to the reduction in protein synthesis capacity which contributes to Gcn4-mediated increase of yeast lifespan.

In budding yeast, deletion of Gcn4 prevents HIS4 from targeting to the nuclear periphery upon transcriptional activation, indicating that Gcn4 is necessary for regulation of gene positioning and transcription.

== See also ==
- DNA-binding protein
- Transcription factor
