= Transcription coregulator =

Proteins that help regulate transcription

Transcription factor glossary
- gene expression – the process by which information from a gene is used in the synthesis of a functional gene product such as a protein; transcription – the process of making messenger RNA (mRNA) from a DNA template by RNA polymerase; transcription factor – a protein that binds to DNA and regulates gene expression by promoting or suppressing transcription; transcriptional regulation – controlling the rate of gene transcription for example by helping or hindering RNA polymerase binding to DNA; upregulation, activation, or promotion – increase the rate of gene transcription; downregulation, repression, or suppression – decrease the rate of gene transcription; coactivator – a protein (or a small molecule) that works with transcription factors to increase the rate of gene transcription; corepressor – a protein (or a small molecule) that works with transcription factors to decrease the rate of gene transcription; response element – a specific sequence of DNA that a transcription factor binds to

In molecular biology and genetics, transcription coregulators are proteins that interact with transcription factors to either activate or repress the transcription of specific genes. Transcription coregulators that activate gene transcription are referred to as coactivators while those that repress are known as corepressors. The mechanism of action of transcription coregulators is to modify chromatin structure and thereby make the associated DNA more or less accessible to transcription. In humans several dozen to several hundred coregulators are known, depending on the level of confidence with which the characterisation of a protein as a coregulator can be made. One class of transcription coregulators modifies chromatin structure through covalent modification of histones. A second ATP dependent class modifies the conformation of chromatin.

== Histone acetyltransferases ==
Nuclear DNA is normally tightly wrapped around histones rendering the DNA inaccessible to the general transcription machinery and hence this tight association prevents transcription of DNA. At physiological pH, the phosphate component of the DNA backbone is deprotonated which gives DNA a net negative charge. Histones are rich in lysine residues which at physiological pH are protonated and therefore positively charged. The electrostatic attraction between these opposite charges is largely responsible for the tight binding of DNA to histones.

Many coactivator proteins have intrinsic histone acetyltransferase (HAT) catalytic activity or recruit other proteins with this activity to promoters. These HAT proteins are able to acetylate the amine group in the sidechain of histone lysine residues which makes lysine much less basic, not protonated at physiological pH, and therefore neutralizes the positive charges in the histone proteins. This charge neutralization weakens the binding of DNA to histones causing the DNA to unwind from the histone proteins and thereby significantly increases the rate of transcription of this DNA.

Many corepressors can recruit histone deacetylase (HDAC) enzymes to promoters. These enzymes catalyze the hydrolysis of acetylated lysine residues restoring the positive charge to histone proteins and hence the tie between histone and DNA. PELP-1 can act as a transcriptional corepressor for transcription factors in the nuclear receptor family such as glucocorticoid receptors.

=== Nuclear receptor coactivators ===
Nuclear receptors bind to coactivators in a ligand-dependent manner. A common feature of nuclear receptor coactivators is that they contain one or more LXXLL binding motifs (a contiguous sequence of 5 amino acids where L = leucine and X = any amino acid) referred to as NR (nuclear receptor) boxes. The LXXLL binding motifs have been shown by X-ray crystallography to bind to a groove on the surface of ligand binding domain of nuclear receptors. Examples include:

- ARA (androgen receptor associated protein)
  - ARA54 (RNF14)
  - ARA55 (TGFB1I1)
  - ARA70 (NCOA4)
- AIRE
- BCAS3 (breast carcinoma amplified sequence 3)
- CREB-binding protein
- CRTC (CREB regulated transcription coactivator)
  - CRTC1 (CRTC1)
  - CRTC2 (CRTC2)
  - CRTC3 (CRTC3)
- CARM1 (coactivator-associated arginine methyltransferase 1) CARM1
- Nuclear receptor coactivator (NCOA)
  - NCOA1/SRC-1 (steroid receptor coactivator-1)/ NCOA1
  - NCOA2/GRIP1 (glucocorticoid receptor interacting protein 1)/ TIF2 (transcriptional intermediary factor 2) NCOA2
  - NCOA3/AIB1 (amplified in breast) NCOA3
  - NCOA4/ARA70 (androgen receptor associated protein 70) NCOA4
  - NCOA5 (NCOA5)
  - NCOA6 (NCOA6)
  - NCOA7 (NCOA7)
- p300 EP300
- PCAF (p300/CBP associating factor) PCAF
- PGC1 (proliferator activated receptor gamma coactivator 1)
  - PPARGC1A (PPARGC1A)
  - PPARGC1B (PPARGC1B)
- PNRC (proline-rich nuclear receptor coactivator 1)
  - PNRC1 (PNRC1)
  - PNRC2 (PNRC2)

=== Nuclear receptor corepressors ===
Corepressor proteins also bind to the surface of the ligand binding domain of nuclear receptors, but through a LXXXIXXX(I/L) motif of amino acids (where L = leucine, I = isoleucine and X = any amino acid). In addition, compressors bind preferentially to the apo (ligand free) form of the nuclear receptor (or possibly antagonist bound receptor).

- CtBP 602618 SIN3A (associates with class II histone deacetylases)
- LCoR (ligand-dependent corepressor)
- Nuclear receptor CO-Repressor (NCOR)
  - NCOR1 (NCOR1)
  - NCOR2 (NCOR2)/SMRT (Silencing Mediator (co-repressor) for Retinoid and Thyroid-hormone receptors) (associates with histone deacetylase-3)
- Rb (retinoblastoma protein) RB1 (associates with histone deacetylase-1 and -2)
- RCOR (REST corepressor)
  - RCOR1 (RCOR1)
  - RCOR2 (RCOR2)
  - RCOR3 (RCOR3)
- Sin3
  - SIN3A (SIN3A)
  - SIN3B (SIN3B)
- TIF1 (transcriptional intermediary factor 1)
  - TRIM24 Tripartite motif-containing 24 (TRIM24)
  - TRIM28 Tripartite motif-containing 28 (TRIM28)
  - TRIM33 Tripartite motif-containing 33 (TRIM33)

=== Dual function activator/repressors ===
- NSD1 (NSD1)
- PELP-1 (proline, glutamic acid and leucine rich protein 1) PELP1
- RIP140 (receptor-interacting protein 140) NRIP1
- YAP
- WWTR1 (TAZ)

== ATP-dependent remodeling factors ==
- SWI/SNF family
- chromatin structure remodeling complex
- ISWI protein SMARCA1, SMARCA2

== See also ==
- Coactivator (genetics)
- Corepressor (genetics)
- Nuclear receptor coregulators
- RNA polymerase control by chromatin structure
- Transcription
- Transcription factor
- TcoF-DB
