= ERX-11 =

Chemical compound

Clinical data
- Other names: ERα coregulator-binding modulator-11
- Routes of administration: By mouth

Identifiers
- IUPAC name: 4-[[4-[[3-(2-hydroxyethoxy)-4-nitrobenzoyl]amino]-3-(2-methylpropoxy)benzoyl]amino]-3-(2-methylpropoxy)benzamide
- CAS Number: 1350897-47-0
- PubChem CID: 54756093
- ChemSpider: 129558925

Chemical and physical data
- Formula: C_{31}H_{36}N_{4}O_{9}
- Molar mass: 608.648 g·mol^{−1}
- 3D model (JSmol): Interactive image
- SMILES: CC(C)COC1=C(C=CC(=C1)C(=O)N)NC(=O)C2=CC(=C(C=C2)NC(=O)C3=CC(=C(C=C3)[N+](=O)[O-])OCCO)OCC(C)C
- InChI: InChI=1S/C31H36N4O9/c1-18(2)16-43-26-13-20(29(32)37)5-8-23(26)33-30(38)21-6-9-24(27(14-21)44-17-19(3)4)34-31(39)22-7-10-25(35(40)41)28(15-22)42-12-11-36/h5-10,13-15,18-19,36H,11-12,16-17H2,1-4H3,(H2,32,37)(H,33,38)(H,34,39); Key:WJKGWRGQNXAVTA-UHFFFAOYSA-N

ERX-11, also known as ERα coregulator-binding modulator-11, is a novel antiestrogen and experimental hormonal antineoplastic agent which is being researched for the potential treatment of estrogen receptor-positive breast cancer. It is not a competitive antagonist of the estrogen receptor (ER) like conventional antiestrogens such as tamoxifen or fulvestrant; instead of binding to the ligand-binding site of the ER, ERX-11 interacts with a different part of the ERα and blocks protein–protein interactions of the ERα with coregulators that are necessary for the receptor to act and regulate gene expression. It was designed to bind to the coregulator binding region of the ERα and inhibit the ERα/coactivator interaction, although its precise binding site and mode of action have yet to be fully elucidated and understood. Nonetheless, it is clear that ERX-11 binds within the AF-2 domain of the ERα.

ERX-11 is an orally active small-molecule tribenzamide compound which shows good antiestrogenic potency in vitro and minimal indications of toxicity in vivo in animals, even at doses much higher than the therapeutic doses. The compound mimics a nuclear receptor binding motif that appears to be critical for the interaction of the ERα with its coactivators. It is able to disrupt interactions between the ERα and 91 ERα-binding coregulators, including SRC1, SRC3, and PELP1. ERX-11 blocked estradiol-induced proliferation in 8 of 8 ER-positive breast cancer cell lines, with IC_{50} values ranging between 250 nM and 500 nM, and was as effective as tamoxifen and fulvestrant in inhibiting the growth of the ZR-75 and MCF-7 breast cancer cell lines. It was inactive in ER-negative breast cancer cell lines.

In contrast to conventional antiestrogens like tamoxifen and fulvestrant, ERX-11 was found to block both ligand-dependent and ligand-independent ER signaling as well as ER signaling in both therapy-sensitive and therapy-resistant breast cancer cells. In addition, it disrupted interactions between the ERα and many ERα-binding coregulators not affected by conventional antiestrogens like tamoxifen (33 of 88 proteins, or 37.5%). It also induced apoptosis in breast cancer cells, unlike tamoxifen. Efforts are underway to assess ERX-11 in human clinical trials.

== See also ==
- N-Terminal domain antiandrogen
