= Rixosome =

Type of stable macromolecular complex

The rixosome is a protein complex involved in RNA degradation, ribosomal RNA (rRNA) processing, and ribosome biogenesis. It was named after the S. cerevisiae gene RIX1. The rixosome is associated with human PRC1 and PRC2 complexes. The interaction with PRC1 appears to be through the RING1B domain of PRC1 based on mutational analysis. The co-localization of the rixosome and PRC complex suggest a role in the rixosomal degradation of nascent RNA to contribute to the silencing of many Polycomb targets in human cells. Regulation of the interaction with the PRC1 complex is mediated by SENP3 which deSUMOylates several rixosome subunits.

== Components ==
Rixosome complex contains the following components:

- WD repeat domain 18
- LAS1L
- TEX10
- PELP1
