= CRTC (disambiguation) =

CRTC may refer to:

== Public, Research and Commercial Organizations ==
- Canadian Radio-television and Telecommunications Commission, a regulatory agency for broadcasting and telecommunications
- Center for Research, Testing, and Consultancy at the Shahjalal University of Science and Technology
- Citizens Regional Transit Corporation, transit organization in the Buffalo-area, New York, USA

== Military Organizations ==
- Canadian Reconnaissance Training Centre at CFAD Dundurn, in Dundurn, Saskatchewan, Canada
- Cold Regions Test Center at Fort Greely, Alaska, USA
- Combat Readiness Training Center:
  - Gulfport Combat Readiness Training Center, Gulfport, Mississippi, USA
  - Savannah Combat Readiness Training Center of the Georgia Air National Guard, in Savannah, Georgia, USA
  - Volk Field Air National Guard Base, Wisconsin, USA
- Combat Replacement Training Center at Lae Nadzab Airport in Lae, Papua New Guinea

== Technology ==
- Video Display Controller, also referred to as a Cathode Ray Tube Controller
  - Motorola 6845, also known as the 6845 CRTC or CRTC6845, a video display controller
  - Direct Rendering Manager § KMS device model: an abstraction in the Linux kernel for hardware CRTCs

== Music ==
- "Can't Repress the Cause", a 1990 song

== See also ==
- Carotenoid 1,2-hydratase, also known as CrtC
- CREB regulated transcription coactivator (disambiguation)
- CTRC (disambiguation)
