= CoREST =

CoREST is a family of closely related corepressor proteins. These proteins down regulate gene expression, not by directly binding to DNA, but rather by binding to and enhancing the activity repressor proteins. In humans, there are three CoREST paralogs: RCOR1 (CoREST1), RCOR2 (CoREST2), and RCOR3 (CoREST3).

CoREST proteins directly interact with RE1-silencing transcription factor (REST). The REST/CoREST complex includes REST, one CoREST paralog (RCOR1, RCOR2, or RCOR3), LSD1/KDM1A, and HDAC1 or HDAC2.

The REST/CoREST/LSD1/HDAC complex couples transcriptional repression (REST) to histone demethylation (LSD1) and deacetylation (HDAC1/2).

CoREST proteins contain an N-terminal ELM2 domain followed by a central SANT domain pair and a C-terminal region that mediates protein interactions. The first SANT domain (SANT1), together with ELM2, are involved in HDAC1/2 recruitment, while the second SANT domain (SANT2) together with the linker regions between SANT1 and SANT2 binds to LSD1/KDM1A. The C-terminal region of CoREST1 and CoREST3 contain several coiled-coil regions that may mediate additional protein-protein interactions.
