= CREB regulated transcription coactivator =

CREB regulated transcription coactivator (CRTC) may refer to the following proteins and genes:

- CRTC1
- CRTC2
- CRTC3

== See also ==
- CREB
- CRTC (disambiguation)
