= BCAS3 =

Protein-coding gene in the species Homo sapiens

Identifiers
- Aliases: BCAS3, GAOB1, MAAB, breast carcinoma amplified sequence 3, microtubule associated cell migration factor, BCAS3 microtubule associated cell migration factor, PHAF2, HEMARS
- External IDs: OMIM: 607470; MGI: 2385848; GeneCards: BCAS3

Gene location (Human)
Chr.	Chromosome 17 (human)
Band	17q23.2	Start	60,677,453 bp
Band	17q23.2	End	61,392,838 bp

Gene location (Mouse)
Chr.	Chromosome 11 (mouse)
Band	11|11 C	Start	85,353,167 bp
Band	11|11 C	End	85,826,058 bp
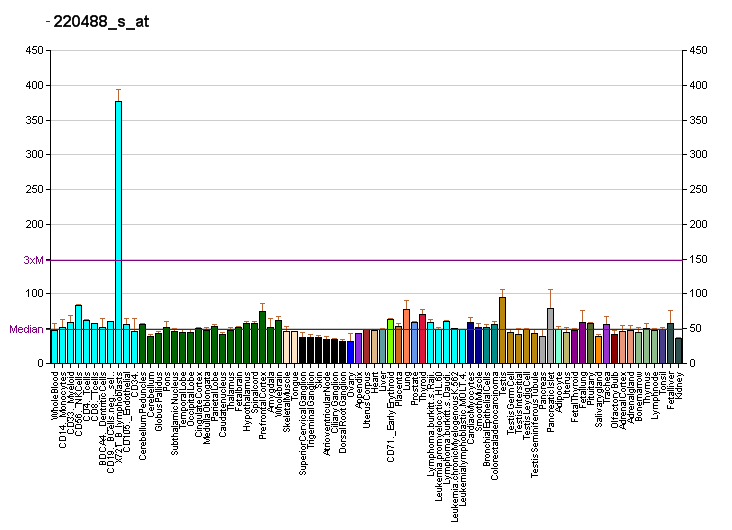
RNA expression pattern
Bgee	Human / Mouse (ortholog); Top expressed in: epithelium of colon; sural nerve; right uterine tube; bone marrow cell; Achilles tendon; prefrontal cortex; testicle; olfactory zone of nasal mucosa; right coronary artery; popliteal artery / Top expressed in: seminal vesicula; morula; muscle of thigh; neural layer of retina; superior frontal gyrus; dentate gyrus of hippocampal formation granule cell; genital tubercle; blastocyst; lip; yolk sac; More reference expression data
BioGPS	More reference expression data
Gene ontology
Molecular function	histone binding; chromatin binding; acetyltransferase activator activity; beta-tubulin binding; histone acetyltransferase binding; transcription factor binding; protein binding
Cellular component	intermediate filament cytoskeleton; nucleolus; cell periphery; cell leading edge; cytoplasmic microtubule; cytoskeleton; nucleus; cytoplasm
Biological process	angiogenesis; cellular response to estrogen stimulus; positive regulation of endothelial cell migration; positive regulation of GTPase activity; positive regulation of intracellular protein transport; transcription, DNA-templated; positive regulation of actin cytoskeleton reorganization; microtubule organizing center organization; negative regulation of focal adhesion assembly; response to starvation; activation of GTPase activity; Golgi organization; regulation of establishment of cell polarity; tube formation; regulation of transcription, DNA-templated; positive regulation of transcription by RNA polymerase II; negative regulation of GTPase activity; positive regulation of catalytic activity; positive regulation of filopodium assembly; vesicle-mediated transport
Sources:Amigo / QuickGO
Orthologs
Databases	NCBI: entry; OMA: entry
Species	Human	Mouse
Entrez	54828	192197
Ensembl	ENSG00000141376	ENSMUSG00000059439
UniProt	Q9H6U6	Q8CCN5
RefSeq (mRNA)	NM_001099432; NM_017679; NM_001320470; NM_001330413; NM_001330414 NM_001353144; NM_001353145; NM_001353146	NM_001166642; NM_001166643; NM_138681
RefSeq (protein)	NP_001092902; NP_001307399; NP_001317342; NP_001317343; NP_060149 NP_001340073; NP_001340074; NP_001340075	NP_001160114; NP_001160115; NP_619622
Location (UCSC)	Chr 17: 60.68 – 61.39 Mb	Chr 11: 85.35 – 85.83 Mb
PubMed search
- Wikidata
View/Edit Human	View/Edit Mouse

Breast carcinoma amplified sequence 3, also known as BCAS3, is a protein which in humans is encoded by the BCAS3 gene. BCAS3 is a gene that is amplified and overexpressed in breast cancer cells.

== Function ==
The BCAS3 gene is regulated by estrogen receptor alpha (ER-α). The PELP1 protein acts as a transcriptional coactivator of estrogen receptor induced BCAS3 gene expression. In addition BCAS3 possesses histone acetyltransferase activity and itself appears to act as a coactivator of ER-α. Furthermore, BCAS3 requires PELP1 to function as a coactivator in ER-α. Hence BCAS3 apparently is involved in a positive feedback loop leading to ER-α mediated signal amplification.
