= NCOA5 =

Gene of the species Homo sapiens

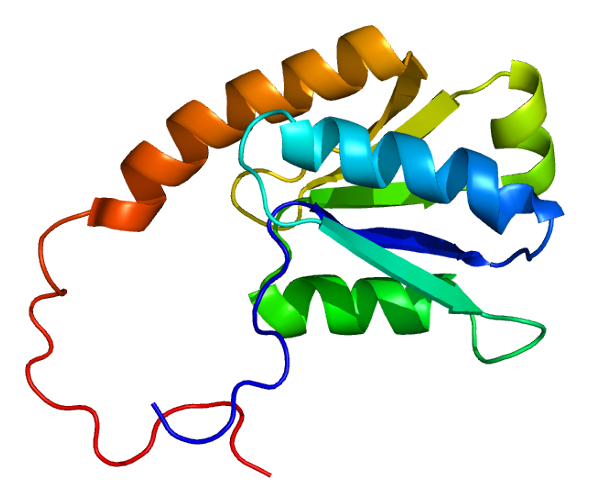
Available structures
| PDB | Ortholog search: PDBe RCSB |
| PDB | List of PDB id codes 1V95, 2J7Y, 4ZI1 |

Identifiers
- Aliases: NCOA5, CIA, bA465L10.6, nuclear receptor coactivator 5
- External IDs: OMIM: 616825; MGI: 2385165; HomoloGene: 32496; GeneCards: NCOA5; OMA:NCOA5 - orthologs

Gene location (Mouse)
| Chr. | Chromosome 2 (mouse) |
| Band | 2|2 H3 | Start | 164,842,277 bp |
| Band | 2|2 H3 | End | 164,876,787 bp |
Gene ontology
| Molecular function | protein binding; chromatin binding; RNA binding |
| Cellular component | nucleus; actin cytoskeleton; extracellular space |
| Biological process | negative regulation of insulin receptor signaling pathway; regulation of transcription, DNA-templated; glucose homeostasis; transcription, DNA-templated |
Sources:Amigo / QuickGO
Orthologs
| Species | Human | Mouse |
| Entrez | 57727 | 228869 |
| Ensembl | ENSG00000124160 | ENSMUSG00000039804 |
| UniProt | Q9HCD5; Q5JY17 | Q91W39 |
| RefSeq (mRNA) | NM_020967 | NM_144892 |
| RefSeq (protein) | NP_066018; NP_001335077; NP_001335078; NP_001335079; NP_001335080 | NP_659141 |
| Location (UCSC) | n/a | Chr 2: 164.84 – 164.88 Mb |
| PubMed search |
- Wikidata
| View/Edit Human | View/Edit Mouse |

Nuclear receptor coactivator 5 (NCOA5), also known as coactivator independent of AF-2 function (CIA), is a protein that in humans is encoded by the NCOA5 gene.

== Function ==
This gene encodes a coregulator for the alpha and beta estrogen receptors and the orphan nuclear receptor Rev-ErbA beta. The protein localizes to the nucleus, and is thought to have both coactivator and corepressor functions. Its interaction with nuclear receptors is independent of the AF2 domain on the receptors, which is known to regulate interaction with other coreceptors. Two alternatively spliced transcript variants for this gene have been described. However, the full length nature of one of the variants has not been determined.
