= WD repeat domain 18 =

Protein-coding gene in the species Homo sapiens

WDR18

Identifiers
- Aliases: WDR18, Ipi3, R32184_1, WD repeat domain 18
- External IDs: MGI: 2158400; GeneCards: WDR18

Gene location (Human)
Chr.	Chromosome 19 (human)
Band	19p13.3	Start	984,332 bp
Band	19p13.3	End	998,438 bp

Gene location (Mouse)
Chr.	Chromosome 10 (mouse)
Band	10|10 C1	Start	79,795,986 bp
Band	10|10 C1	End	79,806,037 bp
RNA expression pattern
Bgee	Human / Mouse (ortholog); Top expressed in: right hemisphere of cerebellum; right lobe of liver; mucosa of transverse colon; apex of heart; anterior pituitary; right adrenal cortex; right frontal lobe; left adrenal gland; muscle of thigh; left adrenal cortex / Top expressed in: epiblast; embryo; embryo; morula; right kidney; blastocyst; hand; spermatid; spermatocyte; neural tube; More reference expression data
BioGPS	n/a
Gene ontology
Molecular function	protein binding
Cellular component	nucleus; cytoplasm; nucleoplasm; nucleolus; nuclear pre-replicative complex; Rix1 complex
Biological process	multicellular organism development; rRNA processing; ribosomal large subunit assembly; pre-replicative complex assembly involved in nuclear cell cycle DNA replication; regulation of DNA-dependent DNA replication initiation
Sources:Amigo / QuickGO
Orthologs
Databases	NCBI: entry; OMA: entry
Species	Human	Mouse
Entrez	57418	216156
Ensembl	ENSG00000065268	ENSMUSG00000035754
UniProt	Q9BV38	Q4VBE8
RefSeq (mRNA)	NM_024100; NM_001372085; NM_001372086	NM_175450
RefSeq (protein)	NP_077005; NP_001359014; NP_001359015	NP_780659
Location (UCSC)	Chr 19: 0.98 – 1 Mb	Chr 10: 79.8 – 79.81 Mb
PubMed search
- Wikidata
View/Edit Human	View/Edit Mouse

WD repeat domain 18 is a protein that in humans is encoded by the WDR18 gene.

== Function ==
This gene encodes a member of the WD repeat protein family. WD repeats are minimally conserved regions of approximately 40 amino acids typically bracketed by gly-his and trp-asp (GH-WD), which may facilitate formation of heterotrimeric or multiprotein complexes. Members of this family are involved in a variety of cellular processes, including cell cycle progression, signal transduction, apoptosis, and gene regulation. WDR18 forms a nucleolar complex with LAS1L, PELP1, TEX10 called the rixosome which is involved in RNA degradation. The rixosome is a nucleolar complex that cofractionates with the 60S preribosomal subunit. Recruitment of the rixosome by the Polycomb Repressive Complex 1 has been proposed to lead to its functioning in establishing repressive chromatin structures by assisting in degrading nascent RNA.
