= ZNF366 =

Protein-coding gene in the species Homo sapiens

Identifiers
- Aliases: ZNF366, DCSCRIPT, zinc finger protein 366, DC-SCRIPT
- External IDs: OMIM: 610159; MGI: 2178429; GeneCards: ZNF366

Gene location (Human)
Chr.	Chromosome 5 (human)
Band	5q13.2|5q13.2	Start	72,439,903 bp
Band	5q13.2|5q13.2	End	72,507,410 bp

Gene location (Mouse)
Chr.	Chromosome 13 (mouse)
Band	13|13 D1	Start	99,321,331 bp
Band	13|13 D1	End	99,387,164 bp
RNA expression pattern
Bgee	Human / Mouse (ortholog); Top expressed in: sural nerve; testicle; epithelium of colon; smooth muscle tissue; gonad; apex of heart; appendix; left ventricle; lymph node; subcutaneous adipose tissue / Top expressed in: lung; muscle of thigh; quadriceps femoris muscle; muscle tissue; spleen; skeletal muscle tissue; white adipose tissue; adrenal gland; cerebellum; human kidney; More reference expression data
BioGPS	n/a
Gene ontology
Molecular function	DNA binding; estrogen receptor binding; protein binding; transcription corepressor activity; metal ion binding; nucleic acid binding; DNA-binding transcription factor activity, RNA polymerase II-specific
Cellular component	nucleus
Biological process	negative regulation of transcription by RNA polymerase II; negative regulation of intracellular estrogen receptor signaling pathway; regulation of transcription, DNA-templated; transcription, DNA-templated; response to estrogen
Sources:Amigo / QuickGO
Orthologs
Databases	NCBI: entry; OMA: entry
Species	Human	Mouse
Entrez	167465	238803
Ensembl	ENSG00000178175	ENSMUSG00000050919
UniProt	Q8N895	Q6NS86
RefSeq (mRNA)	NM_152625	NM_001004149
RefSeq (protein)	NP_689838	NP_001004149
Location (UCSC)	Chr 5: 72.44 – 72.51 Mb	Chr 13: 99.32 – 99.39 Mb
PubMed search
- Wikidata
View/Edit Human	View/Edit Mouse

Zinc finger protein 366, also known as DC-SCRIPT (Dendritic cell-specific transcript), is a protein that in humans is encoded by the ZNF366 gene. The ZNF366 gene was first identified in a DNA comparison study between 85 kb of Fugu rubripes sequence containing 17 genes with its homologous loci in the human draft genome.

== Function ==
In 2006, DC-SCRIPT was isolated and characterized in human monocyte-derived dendritic cells (mo-DCs).

DC-SCRIPT contains a DNA-binding domain (11 C_{2}H_{2} zinc (Zn) fingers), flanked by a proline-rich and an acidic region, which can interact with C-terminal-binding protein 1 (CtBP1), a global corepressor. In the immune system of both mice and humans, DC-SCRIPT was found to be specifically expressed in dendritic cells (DCs).

In COS-1 cells, DC-SCRIPT was shown to interact with the estrogen receptor DNA-binding domain (ERDBD) and represses ER activity through the association with RIP140, CtBP and histone deacetylases.

In DCs, DC-SCRIPT was found to be highly expressed in type one conventional DCs (cDC1s) under the control of PU.1. The presence of DC-SCRIPT is important for the cDC1s lineage specification via maintaining Interferon regulatory factor 8 (IRF8) expression. The DC-SCRIPT deficient cDC1s had impaired capacity to capture and present cell-associated antigens and to secrete IL-12p40.

== Breast cancer ==
In 2010, it was shown that DC-SCRIPT can act as a coregulator of multiple nuclear receptors having opposite effects on type I vs type II NRs. DC-SCRIPT is able to repress ER and PR mediated transcription, whereas it can activate transcription mediated by RAR and PPAR. In the same study, it was shown that breast tumor tissue expresses lower levels of DC-SCRIPT than normal breast tissue from the same patient and that DC-SCRIPT mRNA expression is an independent prognostic factor for good survival of breast cancer patients with estrogen receptor- and/or progesterone receptor-positive tumors.
