= SPEN =

Protein-coding gene in humans

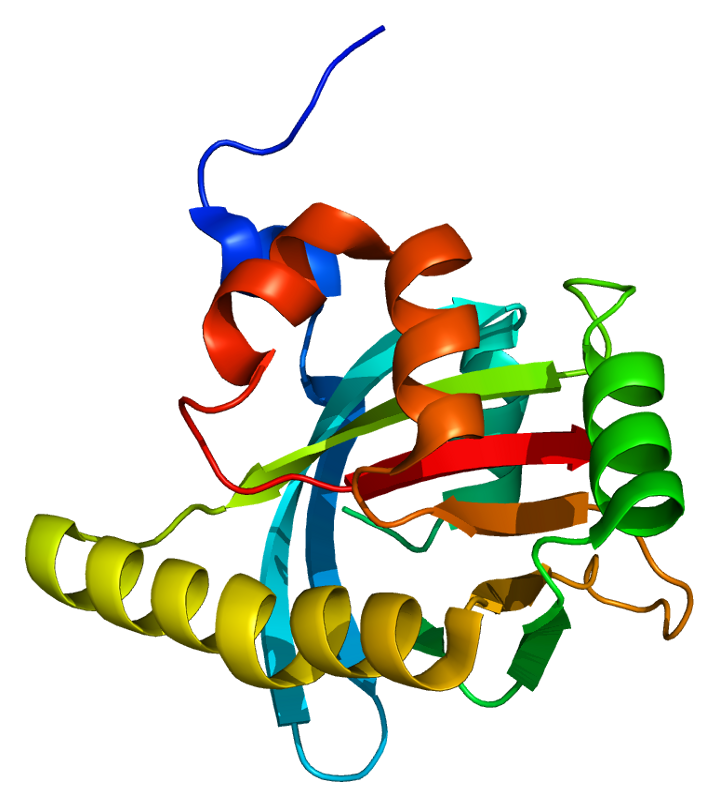

Identifiers
- Aliases: SPEN, HIAA0929, MINT, RBM15C, SHARP, spen family transcriptional repressor, RATARS
- External IDs: OMIM: 613484; MGI: 1891706; GeneCards: SPEN
Available structures
PDB	Ortholog search: PDBe RCSB
PDB	List of PDB id codes 1OW1, 2RT5, 4P6Q

Gene location (Human)
Chr.	Chromosome 1 (human)
Band	1p36.21-p36.13	Start	15,836,095 bp
Band	1p36.21-p36.13	End	15,940,456 bp

Gene location (Mouse)
Chr.	Chromosome 4 (mouse)
Band	4|4 D3	Start	141,195,201 bp
Band	4|4 D3	End	141,265,908 bp
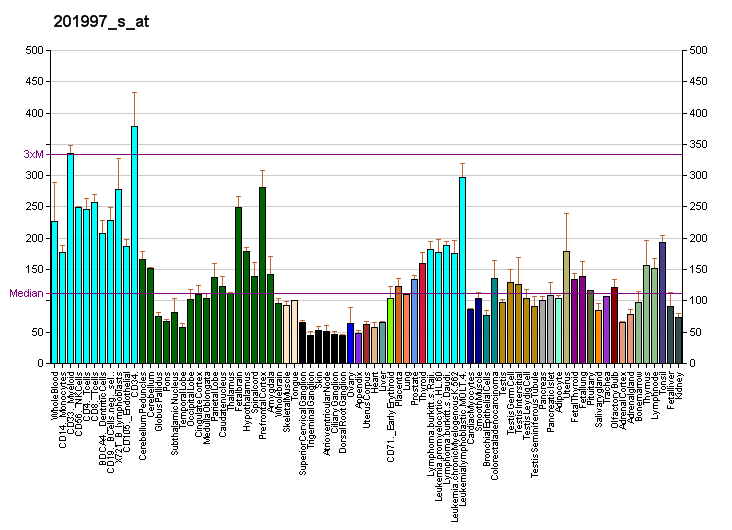
RNA expression pattern
Bgee	Human / Mouse (ortholog); Top expressed in: ventricular zone; ganglionic eminence; optic nerve; popliteal artery; tibial arteries; parotid gland; Descending thoracic aorta; right hemisphere of cerebellum; Achilles tendon; ascending aorta / Top expressed in: internal carotid artery; external carotid artery; Rostral migratory stream; granulocyte; ventricular zone; genital tubercle; tail of embryo; crypt of lieberkuhn of small intestine; visual cortex; neural layer of retina; More reference expression data
BioGPS	More reference expression data
Gene ontology
Molecular function	DNA binding; protein binding; nucleic acid binding; RNA binding; transcription corepressor activity
Cellular component	transcription repressor complex; extracellular exosome; nucleus; nucleoplasm
Biological process	Notch signaling pathway; positive regulation of neurogenesis; mRNA splicing, via spliceosome; viral process; negative regulation of transcription, DNA-templated; regulation of transcription, DNA-templated; negative regulation of transcription by RNA polymerase II; transcription, DNA-templated
Sources:Amigo / QuickGO
Orthologs
Databases	NCBI: entry; OMA: entry
Species	Human	Mouse
Entrez	23013	56381
Ensembl	ENSG00000065526	ENSMUSG00000040761
UniProt	Q96T58	Q62504
RefSeq (mRNA)	NM_015001	NM_019763; NM_001347235
RefSeq (protein)	NP_055816	NP_001334164; NP_062737
Location (UCSC)	Chr 1: 15.84 – 15.94 Mb	Chr 4: 141.2 – 141.27 Mb
PubMed search
- Wikidata
View/Edit Human	View/Edit Mouse

Msx2-interacting protein is a protein that in humans is encoded by the SPEN gene.

This gene encodes a hormone inducible transcriptional repressor. Repression of transcription by this gene product can occur through interactions with other repressors, by the recruitment of proteins involved in histone deacetylation, or through sequestration of transcriptional activators. The product of this gene contains a carboxy-terminal domain that permits binding to other corepressor proteins. This domain also permits interaction with members of the NuRD complex, a nucleosome remodeling protein complex that contains deacetylase activity. In addition, this repressor contains several RNA recognition motifs that confer binding to a steroid receptor RNA coactivator; this binding can modulate the activity of both liganded and nonliganded steroid receptors.

== Interactions ==
SPEN has been shown to interact with HDAC1, SRA1 and Nuclear receptor co-repressor 2.
