= SRA1 =

Protein-coding gene in the species Homo sapiens

Available structures
PDB	Ortholog search: PDBe RCSB
PDB	List of PDB id codes 2MGX, 4NBO

Identifiers
- Aliases: SRA1, SRA, SRAP, STRAA1, pp7684, steroid receptor RNA activator 1
- External IDs: OMIM: 603819; MGI: 1344414; HomoloGene: 11906; GeneCards: SRA1; OMA:SRA1 - orthologs

Gene location (Human)
Chr.	Chromosome 5 (human)
Band	5q31.3	Start	140,537,340 bp
Band	5q31.3	End	140,557,677 bp

Gene location (Mouse)
Chr.	Chromosome 18 (mouse)
Band	18|18 B2	Start	36,799,734 bp
Band	18|18 B2	End	36,803,868 bp
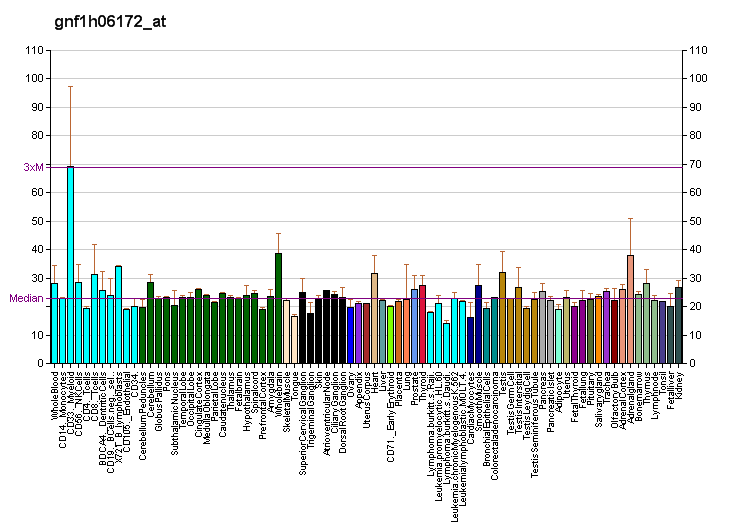
RNA expression pattern
Bgee	Human / Mouse (ortholog); Top expressed in: pancreatic ductal cell; left adrenal gland; left adrenal cortex; right adrenal gland; right adrenal cortex; anterior pituitary; myocardium of left ventricle; cardiac muscle tissue of right atrium; stromal cell of endometrium; blood / Top expressed in: right kidney; yolk sac; calvaria; duodenum; left lobe of liver; temporal muscle; embryo; muscle of thigh; lip; molar; More reference expression data
BioGPS	More reference expression data
Gene ontology
Molecular function	transcription coactivator activity; protein binding; nuclear receptor coactivator activity; steroid receptor RNA activator RNA binding; DNA binding
Cellular component	microtubule cytoskeleton; intercellular bridge; plasma membrane; nucleus; nucleoplasm; cytosol; cytoplasm; ribonucleoprotein complex; transcription regulator complex; cell leading edge
Biological process	regulation of apoptotic process; cell differentiation; positive regulation of signaling receptor activity; cell population proliferation; regulation of transcription, DNA-templated; transcription, DNA-templated; apoptotic process; regulation of transcription by RNA polymerase II; negative regulation of myoblast differentiation; cellular response to estrogen stimulus; positive regulation of nucleic acid-templated transcription
Sources:Amigo / QuickGO
Orthologs
Species	Human	Mouse
Entrez	10011	24068
Ensembl	ENSG00000213523	ENSMUSG00000006050
UniProt	Q9HD15	Q80VJ2
RefSeq (mRNA)	NM_001035235; NM_001253764	NM_001164406; NM_025291
RefSeq (protein)	NP_001030312; NP_001240693	NP_001157878; NP_079567
Location (UCSC)	Chr 5: 140.54 – 140.56 Mb	Chr 18: 36.8 – 36.8 Mb
PubMed search
- Wikidata
View/Edit Human	View/Edit Mouse

Steroid receptor RNA activator 1 also known as steroid receptor RNA activator protein (SRAP) is a protein that in humans is encoded by the SRA1 gene. The mRNA transcribed from the SRA1 gene is a component of the ribonucleoprotein complex containing NCOA1. This functional RNA also encodes a protein.

== Function ==
This gene is involved in transcriptional coactivation by steroid receptor. There is currently data suggesting this gene encodes both a non-coding RNA that functions as part of a ribonucleoprotein complex and a protein coding mRNA. Increased expression of both the transcript and the protein is associated with cancer.

== Interactions ==
SRA1 has been shown to interact with:

- Estrogen receptor alpha,
- DDX17,
- Nuclear receptor coactivator 2, and
- SPEN.

The SRAP has been shown to interact with its SRA RNA counterpart indirectly with the functional sub-structure STR7 of SRA RNA. Originally proposed to be RRM containing, SRAP has been demonstrated to have a helix bundle at its C-terminal end while N-terminal to this domain appears unstructured.
