= RCOR3 =

Protein-coding gene in humans

Identifiers
- Aliases: RCOR3, REST corepressor 3
- External IDs: MGI: 2441920; GeneCards: RCOR3
Available structures
PDB	Ortholog search: PDBe RCSB
PDB	List of PDB id codes 4CZZ

Gene location (Human)
Chr.	Chromosome 1 (human)
Band	1q32.2-q32.3	Start	211,258,377 bp
Band	1q32.2-q32.3	End	211,316,385 bp
RNA expression pattern
Bgee	Human / Mouse (ortholog); Top expressed in: sperm; right testis; left testis; muscle of thigh; gastrocnemius muscle; tibia; gastric mucosa; right lobe of thyroid gland; left lobe of thyroid gland; right uterine tube / n/a; More reference expression data
BioGPS	n/a
Gene ontology
Molecular function	DNA binding; protein binding; transcription factor binding; transcription corepressor activity; DNA-binding transcription factor activity; DNA-binding transcription factor activity, RNA polymerase II-specific
Cellular component	transcription repressor complex; nucleus; transcription regulator complex
Biological process	regulation of transcription, DNA-templated; transcription, DNA-templated; negative regulation of transcription by RNA polymerase II; regulation of transcription by RNA polymerase II; negative regulation of nucleic acid-templated transcription
Sources:Amigo / QuickGO
Orthologs
Databases	NCBI: entry; OMA: entry
Species	Human	Mouse
Entrez	55758	214742
Ensembl	ENSG00000117625	ENSMUSG00000037395
UniProt	Q9P2K3	Q6PGA0
RefSeq (mRNA)	NM_001136223; NM_001136224; NM_001136225; NM_018254; NM_001350069 NM_001350070	NM_001290278; NM_001290279; NM_001290280; NM_001290282; NM_144814
RefSeq (protein)	NP_001129695; NP_001129696; NP_001129697; NP_060724; NP_001336998 NP_001336999	NP_001277207; NP_001277208; NP_001277209; NP_001277211; NP_001333669 NP_659063; NP_001390203; NP_001390204
Location (UCSC)	Chr 1: 211.26 – 211.32 Mb	n/a
PubMed search
- Wikidata
View/Edit Human	View/Edit Mouse

REST corepressor 3 (CoREST3) is a protein that in humans is encoded by the RCOR3 gene. It is a member of the CoREST family of corepressor proteins that plays a scaffolding role in stabilizing the REST / CoREST / LSD1 / HDAC complex. This complex's function is to down regulate gene expression.

CoREST3 has been proposed as a prognosis biomarker of hepatitis B infection.
