= PPARGC1B =

Protein-coding gene in the species Homo sapiens

Identifiers
- Aliases: PPARGC1B, ERRL1, PERC, PGC-1(beta), PGC1B, PPARG coactivator 1 beta
- External IDs: OMIM: 608886; MGI: 2444934; GeneCards: PPARGC1B
Available structures
PDB	Ortholog search: PDBe RCSB
PDB	List of PDB id codes 3SP6

Gene location (Human)
Chr.	Chromosome 5 (human)
Band	5q32	Start	149,730,298 bp
Band	5q32	End	149,855,022 bp

Gene location (Mouse)
Chr.	Chromosome 18 (mouse)
Band	18|18 E1	Start	61,431,207 bp
Band	18|18 E1	End	61,533,502 bp
RNA expression pattern
Bgee	Human / Mouse (ortholog); Top expressed in: endothelial cell; secondary oocyte; germinal epithelium; jejunal mucosa; duodenum; testicle; Brodmann area 23; gonad; apex of heart; monocyte / Top expressed in: right ventricle; brown adipose tissue; ciliary body; cerebellar vermis; epithelium of stomach; lobe of cerebellum; left colon; crypt of lieberkuhn of small intestine; olfactory tubercle; pyloric antrum; More reference expression data
BioGPS	n/a
Gene ontology
Molecular function	transcription coregulator activity; AF-2 domain binding; nuclear receptor coactivator activity; RNA binding; nucleic acid binding; transcription factor binding; estrogen receptor binding
Cellular component	mediator complex; mitochondrion; nucleus; nucleoplasm
Biological process	mitochondrial transcription; regulation of transcription, DNA-templated; ossification; actin filament organization; positive regulation of osteoclast differentiation; positive regulation of DNA-binding transcription factor activity; response to glucocorticoid; bone trabecula formation; positive regulation of bone resorption; transcription, DNA-templated; positive regulation of transcription, DNA-templated; cellular response to reactive oxygen species; positive regulation of alkaline phosphatase activity; response to cAMP; positive regulation of phosphorylation; negative regulation of transcription, DNA-templated; intracellular estrogen receptor signaling pathway; positive regulation of transcription by RNA polymerase II; positive regulation of cold-induced thermogenesis; regulation of nucleic acid-templated transcription
Sources:Amigo / QuickGO
Orthologs
Databases	NCBI: entry; OMA: entry
Species	Human	Mouse
Entrez	133522	170826
Ensembl	ENSG00000155846	ENSMUSG00000033871
UniProt	Q86YN6	Q8VHJ7
RefSeq (mRNA)	NM_001172698; NM_001172699; NM_133263	NM_133249; NM_001364996
RefSeq (protein)	NP_001166169; NP_001166170; NP_573570	NP_573512; NP_001351925
Location (UCSC)	Chr 5: 149.73 – 149.86 Mb	Chr 18: 61.43 – 61.53 Mb
PubMed search
- Wikidata
View/Edit Human	View/Edit Mouse

Peroxisome proliferator-activated receptor gamma coactivator 1-beta is a protein that in humans is encoded by the PPARGC1B gene.

== See also ==
- PPARGC1A
- Peroxisome proliferator-activated receptor
- Peroxisome proliferator-activated receptor alpha
- Peroxisome proliferator-activated receptor delta
- Peroxisome proliferator-activated receptor gamma
- Transcription coregulator
