= NCOA7 =

Protein-coding gene in the species Homo sapiens

Identifiers
- Aliases: NCOA7, ERAP140, ESNA1, NCOA7-AS, Nbla00052, Nbla10993, TLDC4, dJ187J11.3, nuclear receptor coactivator 7
- External IDs: OMIM: 609752; MGI: 2444847; HomoloGene: 65245; GeneCards: NCOA7; OMA:NCOA7 - orthologs

Gene location (Human)
Chr.	Chromosome 6 (human)
Band	6q22.31-q22.32	Start	125,781,161 bp
Band	6q22.31-q22.32	End	125,932,034 bp

Gene location (Mouse)
Chr.	Chromosome 10 (mouse)
Band	10|10 A4	Start	30,504,995 bp
Band	10|10 A4	End	30,679,322 bp
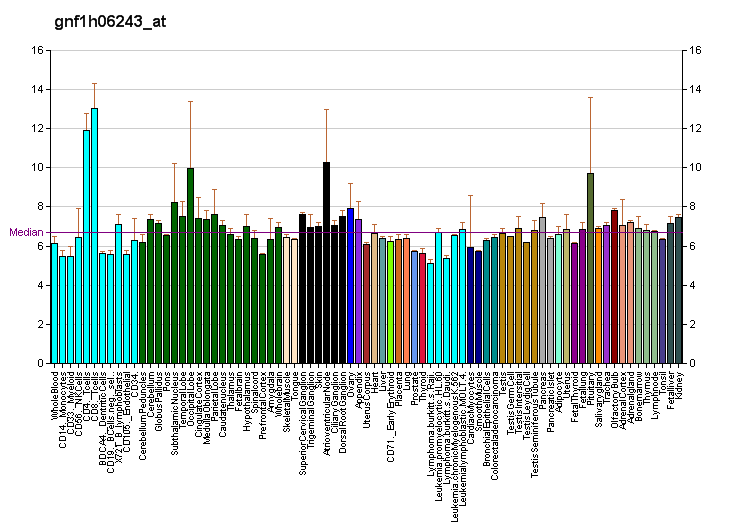

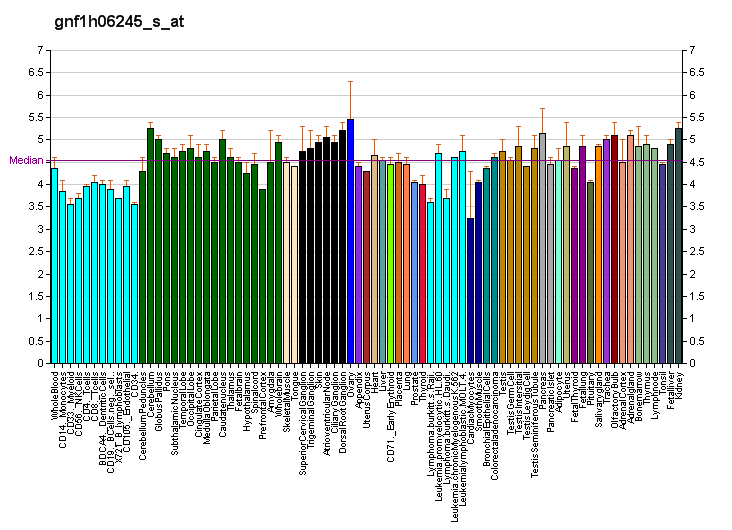

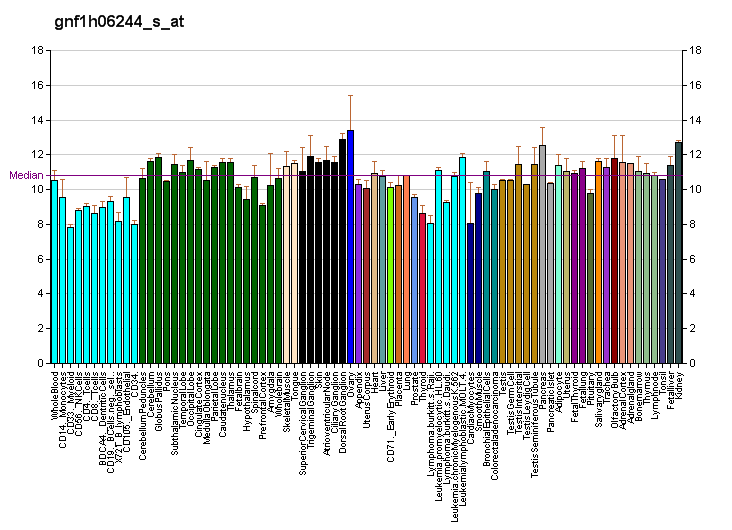
RNA expression pattern
Bgee	Human / Mouse (ortholog); Top expressed in: Brodmann area 23; pancreatic epithelial cell; mucosa of paranasal sinus; Brodmann area 46; middle temporal gyrus; endothelial cell; parietal pleura; visceral pleura; spinal ganglia; pons / Top expressed in: cervix; ventral tegmental area; dorsomedial hypothalamic nucleus; medial vestibular nucleus; subiculum; superior colliculus; blood; dorsal tegmental nucleus; paraventricular nucleus of hypothalamus; lobe of cerebellum; More reference expression data
BioGPS	More reference expression data
Gene ontology
Molecular function	protein binding; nuclear receptor coactivator activity
Cellular component	intracellular anatomical structure; nucleus
Biological process	regulation of transcription, DNA-templated; transcription, DNA-templated; positive regulation of transcription by RNA polymerase II; negative regulation of cellular response to oxidative stress; negative regulation of peptidyl-cysteine S-nitrosylation; negative regulation of oxidative stress-induced neuron death
Sources:Amigo / QuickGO
Orthologs
Species	Human	Mouse
Entrez	135112	211329
Ensembl	ENSG00000111912	ENSMUSG00000039697
UniProt	Q8NI08	Q6DFV7
RefSeq (mRNA)	NM_001122842; NM_001199619; NM_001199620; NM_001199621; NM_001199622 NM_181782	NM_001111267; NM_172495; NM_001358841; NM_001358842
RefSeq (protein)	NP_001116314; NP_001186548; NP_001186549; NP_001186550; NP_001186551 NP_861447	NP_001104737; NP_766083; NP_001345770; NP_001345771
Location (UCSC)	Chr 6: 125.78 – 125.93 Mb	Chr 10: 30.5 – 30.68 Mb
PubMed search
- Wikidata
View/Edit Human	View/Edit Mouse

Nuclear receptor coactivator 7 is a protein that in humans is encoded by the NCOA7 gene.

== See also ==
- Transcription coregulator
