= CARM1 =

Protein found in hums

Identifiers
- Aliases: CARM1, PRMT4, coactivator associated arginine methyltransferase 1
- External IDs: OMIM: 603934; MGI: 1913208; GeneCards: CARM1
Available structures
PDB	Ortholog search: PDBe RCSB
PDB	List of PDB id codes 2Y1W, 2Y1X, 4IKP, 5DX1, 5DX8, 5DXJ, 5DX0, 5DWQ, 5DXA
Enzyme activity
EC #	BRENDA	ExPASy	KEGG	MetaCyc
2.1.1.319	↗	↗	↗	↗
2.1.1.321	↗	↗	↗	↗

Gene location (Human)
Chr.	Chromosome 19 (human)
Band	19p13.2	Start	10,871,553 bp
Band	19p13.2	End	10,923,075 bp

Gene location (Mouse)
Chr.	Chromosome 9 (mouse)
Band	9|9 A3	Start	21,458,190 bp
Band	9|9 A3	End	21,503,919 bp
RNA expression pattern
Bgee	Human / Mouse (ortholog); Top expressed in: muscle of thigh; gastrocnemius muscle; right testis; left testis; stromal cell of endometrium; right hemisphere of cerebellum; ectocervix; ganglionic eminence; canal of the cervix; right uterine tube / Top expressed in: internal carotid artery; external carotid artery; tail of embryo; genital tubercle; epiblast; somite; mandibular prominence; maxillary prominence; atrium; Gonadal ridge; More reference expression data
BioGPS	n/a
Gene ontology
Molecular function	methyltransferase activity; histone methyltransferase activity; transferase activity; beta-catenin binding; protein homodimerization activity; transcription coactivator activity; protein binding; nuclear receptor coactivator activity; lysine-acetylated histone binding; protein methyltransferase activity; histone methyltransferase activity (H3-R17 specific); histone-arginine N-methyltransferase activity; protein-arginine N-methyltransferase activity; protein-arginine omega-N asymmetric methyltransferase activity
Cellular component	cytoplasm; nucleoplasm; RNA polymerase II transcription regulator complex; nucleus; cytosol; protein-containing complex
Biological process	regulation of growth plate cartilage chondrocyte proliferation; regulation of mRNA binding; histone H3-R17 methylation; peptidyl-arginine N-methylation; ageing; regulation of intracellular estrogen receptor signaling pathway; intracellular steroid hormone receptor signaling pathway; negative regulation of protein binding; transcription, DNA-templated; negative regulation of dendrite development; histone H3-R2 methylation; histone arginine methylation; methylation; peptidyl-arginine methylation, to asymmetrical-dimethyl arginine; positive regulation of cell population proliferation; histone methylation; response to cAMP; viral process; positive regulation of fat cell differentiation; endochondral bone morphogenesis; intracellular estrogen receptor signaling pathway; protein methylation; DNA damage response, signal transduction by p53 class mediator resulting in cell cycle arrest; positive regulation of transcription by RNA polymerase II; positive regulation of NF-kappaB transcription factor activity; protein localization to chromatin; regulation of lipid metabolic process; regulation of transcription, DNA-templated; transcription by RNA polymerase II; chromatin organization
Sources:Amigo / QuickGO
Orthologs
Databases	NCBI: entry; OMA: entry
Species	Human	Mouse
Entrez	10498	59035
Ensembl	ENSG00000142453	ENSMUSG00000032185
UniProt	Q86X55	Q9WVG6
RefSeq (mRNA)	NM_199141; NM_001370088; NM_001370089	NM_021531; NM_153141
RefSeq (protein)	NP_954592; NP_001357017; NP_001357018	NP_067506; NP_694781
Location (UCSC)	Chr 19: 10.87 – 10.92 Mb	Chr 9: 21.46 – 21.5 Mb
PubMed search
- Wikidata
View/Edit Human	View/Edit Mouse

CARM1 (coactivator-associated arginine methyltransferase 1), also known as PRMT4 (protein arginine N-methyltransferase 4), is an enzyme (EC 2.1.1.125) encoded by the CARM1 gene found in human beings, as well as many other mammals. It has a polypeptide (L) chain type that is 348 residues long, and is made up of alpha helices and beta sheets. Its main function includes catalyzing the transfer of a methyl group from S-Adenosyl methionine to the side chain nitrogens of arginine residues within proteins to form methylated arginine derivatives and S-Adenosyl-L-homocysteine. CARM1 is a secondary coactivator through its association with p160 family (SRC-1, GRIP1, AIB) of coactivators. It is responsible for moving cells toward the inner cell mass in developing blastocysts.

== Clinical significance ==
CARM1 plays an important role in androgen receptors and may play a role in prostate cancer progression.

CARM1 exerts both oncogenic and tumor-suppressive functions. In breast cancer, CARM1 methylates chromatin remodeling factor BAF155 to enhance tumor progression and metastasis. In pancreatic cancer, CARM1 methylates and inhibits MDH1 by disrupting its dimerization, which represses mitochondria respiration and inhibits glutamine utilization. CARM1-mediated MDH1 methylation reduces cellular NADPH level and sensitizes cells to oxidative stress, thereby suppressing cell proliferation and colony formation.

== See also ==
- histone-arginine N-methyltransferase
