= Transcriptional coactivator =

Class of proteins involved in regulation of transcription

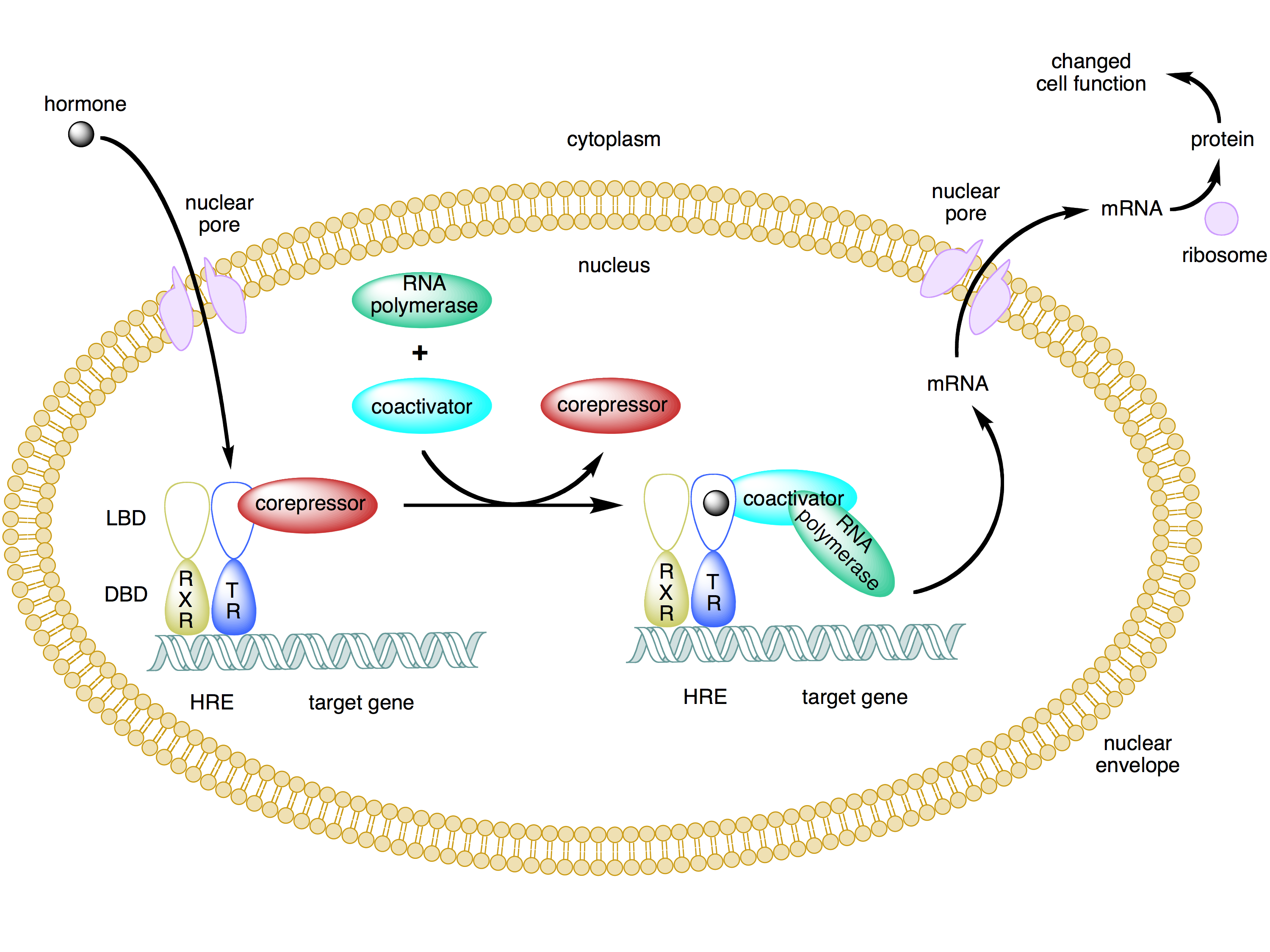
The activator, thyroid hormone receptor (TR), is bound to a corepressor preventing transcription of the target gene. The binding of a ligand hormone causes the corepressor to dissociate and a coactivator is recruited. The activator bound coactivator recruits RNA polymerase and other transcription machinery that then begins transcribing the target gene.

A coactivator is a type of transcriptional coregulator that binds to an activator (a transcription factor) to increase the rate of transcription of a gene or set of genes. The activator contains a DNA binding domain that binds either to a DNA promoter site or a specific DNA regulatory sequence called an enhancer. Binding of the activator-coactivator complex increases the speed of transcription by recruiting general transcription machinery to the promoter, therefore increasing gene expression. The use of activators and coactivators allows for highly specific expression of certain genes depending on cell type and developmental stage.

Some coactivators also have histone acetyltransferase (HAT) activity. HATs form large multiprotein complexes that weaken the association of histones to DNA by acetylating the N-terminal histone tail. This provides more space for the transcription machinery to bind to the promoter, therefore increasing gene expression.

Activators are found in all living organisms, but coactivator proteins are typically only found in eukaryotes because they are more complex and require a more intricate mechanism for gene regulation. In eukaryotes, coactivators are usually proteins that are localized in the nucleus.

== Mechanism ==
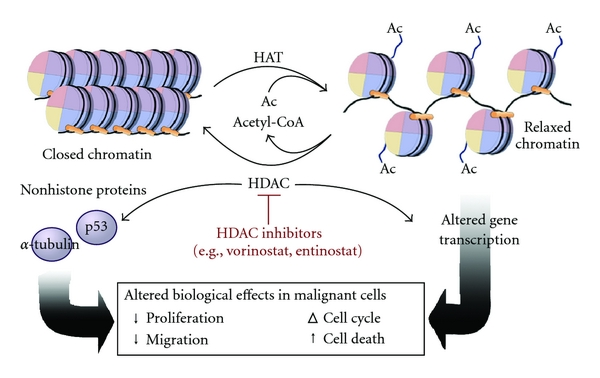
Histone acetyltransferase (HAT) removes the acetyl group from acetyl-CoA and transfers it the N-terminal tail of chromatin histones. In the reverse reaction, histone deacetylase (HDAC) removes the acetyl group from the histone tails and binds it to coenzyme A to form acetyl-CoA.

Some coactivators indirectly regulate gene expression by binding to an activator and inducing a conformational change that then allows the activator to bind to the DNA enhancer or promoter sequence. Once the activator-coactivator complex binds to the enhancer, RNA polymerase II and other general transcription machinery are recruited to the DNA and transcription begins.

=== Histone acetyltransferase ===
Nuclear DNA is normally wrapped tightly around histones, making it hard or impossible for the transcription machinery to access the DNA. This association is due primarily to the electrostatic attraction between the DNA and histones as the DNA phosphate backbone is negatively charged and histones are rich in lysine residues, which are positively charged. The tight DNA-histone association prevents the transcription of DNA into RNA.

Many coactivators have histone acetyltransferase (HAT) activity meaning that they can acetylate specific lysine residues on the N-terminal tails of histones. In this method, an activator binds to an enhancer site and recruits a HAT complex that then acetylates nucleosomal promoter-bound histones by neutralizing the positively charged lysine residues. This charge neutralization causes the histones to have a weaker bond to the negatively charged DNA, which relaxes the chromatin structure, allowing other transcription factors or transcription machinery to bind to the promoter (transcription initiation). Acetylation by HAT complexes may also help keep chromatin open throughout the process of elongation, increasing the speed of transcription.

N-terminal acetyltransferase (NAT) transfers the acetyl group from acetyl coenzyme A (Ac-CoA) to the N-terminal amino group of a polypeptide.

Acetylation of the N-terminal histone tail is one of the most common protein modifications found in eukaryotes, with about 85% of all human proteins being acetylated. Acetylation is crucial for synthesis, stability, function, regulation and localization of proteins and RNA transcripts.

HATs function similarly to N-terminal acetyltransferases (NATs) but their acetylation is reversible unlike in NATs. HAT mediated histone acetylation is reversed using histone deacetylase (HDAC), which catalyzes the hydrolysis of lysine residues, removing the acetyl group from the histones. This causes the chromatin to close back up from their relaxed state, making it difficult for the transcription machinery to bind to the promoter, thus repressing gene expression.

Examples of coactivators that display HAT activity include CARM1, CBP and EP300.

=== Corepression ===
Many coactivators also function as corepressors under certain circumstances. Cofactors such as TAF1 and BTAF1 can initiate transcription in the presence of an activator (act as a coactivator) and repress basal transcription in the absence of an activator (act as a corepressor).

== Significance ==
=== Biological significance ===
Transcriptional regulation is one of the most common ways for an organism to alter gene expression. The use of activation and coactivation allows for greater control over when, where and how much of a protein is produced. This enables each cell to be able to quickly respond to environmental or physiological changes and helps to mitigate any damage that may occur if it were otherwise unregulated.

=== Associated disorders ===
Mutations to coactivator genes leading to loss or gain of protein function have been linked to diseases and disorders such as birth defects, cancer (especially hormone dependent cancers), neurodevelopmental disorders and intellectual disability (ID), among many others. Dysregulation leading to the over- or under-expression of coactivators can detrimentally interact with many drugs (especially anti-hormone drugs) and has been implicated in cancer, fertility issues and neurodevelopmental and neuropsychiatric disorders. For a specific example, dysregulation of CREB-binding protein (CBP)—which acts as a coactivator for numerous transcription factors within the central nervous system (CNS), reproductive system, thymus and kidneys—has been linked to Huntington's disease, leukaemia, Rubinstein-Taybi syndrome, neurodevelopmental disorders and deficits of the immune system, hematopoiesis and skeletal muscle function.

=== As drug targets ===
Coactivators are promising targets for drug therapies in the treatment of cancer, metabolic disorder, cardiovascular disease and type 2 diabetes, along with many other disorders. For example, the steroid receptor coactivator (SCR) NCOA3 is often overexpressed in breast cancer, so the development of an inhibitor molecule that targets this coactivator and decreases its expression could be used as a potential treatment for breast cancer.

Because transcription factors control many different biological processes, they are ideal targets for drug therapy. The coactivators that regulate them can be easily replaced with a synthetic ligand that allows for control over an increase or decrease in gene expression.

Further technological advances will provide new insights into the function and regulation of coactivators at a whole-organism level and elucidate their role in human disease, which will hopefully provide better targets for future drug therapies.

== Known coactivators ==
To date there are more than 300 known coregulators. Some examples of these coactivators include:

- ARA54 targets androgen receptors
- ATXN7L3 targets several members of the nuclear receptor superfamily
- BCL3 targets 9-cis retinoic acid receptor (RXR)
- CBP targets many transcription factors
- CDC25B targets steroid receptors
- COPS5 targets several nuclear receptors
- DDC targets androgen receptors
- EP300 targets many transcription factors
- KAT5 targets many nuclear receptors
- KDM1A targets androgen receptors
- Steroid receptor coactivator (SRC) family
  - NCOA1 targets several members of the nuclear receptor superfamily
  - NCOA2 targets several members of the nuclear receptor superfamily
  - NCOA3 targets several nuclear receptors and transcription factors
- YAP targets transcription factors
- WWTR1 targets transcription factors

== See also ==
- Repressor
- Regulation of gene expression
- Transcription coregulator
- Translation
- TcoF-DB
