= TRIP4 =

Protein-coding gene in the species Homo sapiens

Identifiers
- Aliases: TRIP4, ASC-1, ASC1, HsT17391, ZC2HC5, SMABF1, thyroid hormone receptor interactor 4, MDCDC
- External IDs: OMIM: 604501; MGI: 1928469; GeneCards: TRIP4
Available structures
PDB	Ortholog search: PDBe RCSB
PDB	List of PDB id codes 2E5O

Gene location (Human)
Chr.	Chromosome 15 (human)
Band	15q22.31	Start	64,387,748 bp
Band	15q22.31	End	64,455,303 bp

Gene location (Mouse)
Chr.	Chromosome 9 (mouse)
Band	9|9 C	Start	65,736,212 bp
Band	9|9 C	End	65,816,076 bp
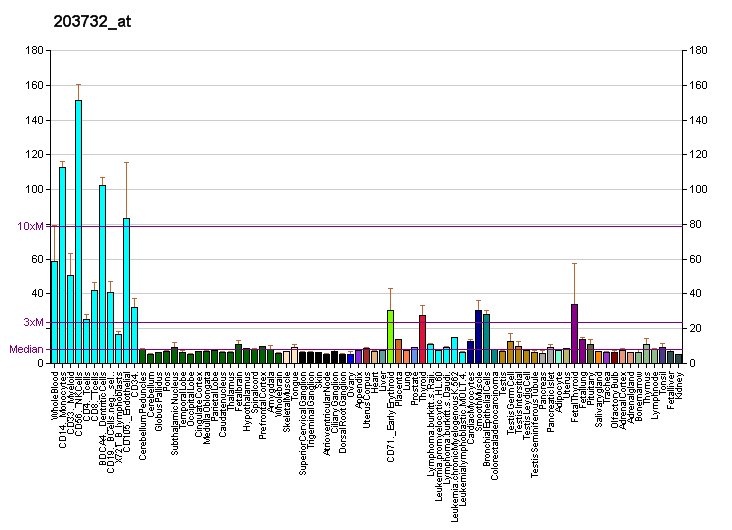
RNA expression pattern
Bgee	Human / Mouse (ortholog); Top expressed in: sural nerve; amniotic fluid; mucosa of transverse colon; jejunal mucosa; monocyte; gonad; right lobe of thyroid gland; left lobe of thyroid gland; ganglionic eminence; anterior pituitary / Top expressed in: pineal gland; granulocyte; spermatocyte; left lobe of liver; zygote; spermatid; lumbar spinal ganglion; secondary oocyte; substantia nigra; cumulus cell; More reference expression data
BioGPS	More reference expression data
Gene ontology
Molecular function	protease binding; transcription coactivator activity; zinc ion binding; estrogen receptor binding; protein binding; histone acetyltransferase binding; nuclear receptor binding; ubiquitin-like protein ligase binding; metal ion binding; protein kinase binding
Cellular component	cytoplasm; cytosol; cytoskeleton; nucleus; nucleoplasm; microtubule organizing center; neuromuscular junction; nuclear body; activating signal cointegrator 1 complex; centrosome; protein-containing complex
Biological process	positive regulation of transcription, DNA-templated; toxin transport; intracellular estrogen receptor signaling pathway; transcription, DNA-templated; regulation of transcription, DNA-templated; regulation of myoblast differentiation
Sources:Amigo / QuickGO
Orthologs
Databases	NCBI: entry; OMA: entry
Species	Human	Mouse
Entrez	9325	56404
Ensembl	ENSG00000103671	ENSMUSG00000032386
UniProt	Q15650	Q9QXN3
RefSeq (mRNA)	NM_016213; NM_001321924	NM_001170907; NM_019797; NM_001357872
RefSeq (protein)	NP_001308853; NP_057297	NP_001164378; NP_062771; NP_001344801
Location (UCSC)	Chr 15: 64.39 – 64.46 Mb	Chr 9: 65.74 – 65.82 Mb
PubMed search
- Wikidata
View/Edit Human	View/Edit Mouse

Activating signal cointegrator 1 is a protein in humans that is encoded by the TRIP4 gene.

== Interactions ==
TRIP4 has been shown to interact with Nuclear receptor coactivator 1.
