= NCOA4 =

Protein-coding gene in the species Homo sapiens

Identifiers
- Aliases: NCOA4, ARA70, ELE1, PTC3, RFG, nuclear receptor coactivator 4
- External IDs: OMIM: 601984; MGI: 1350932; GeneCards: NCOA4
Available structures
PDB	Human UniProt search: PDBe RCSB
PDB	List of PDB id codes 1T5Z

Gene location (Human)
Chr.	Chromosome 10 (human)
Band	10q11.22	Start	46,005,088 bp
Band	10q11.22	End	46,030,623 bp

Gene location (Mouse)
Chr.	Chromosome 14 (mouse)
Band	14|14 B	Start	31,881,822 bp
Band	14|14 B	End	31,901,812 bp
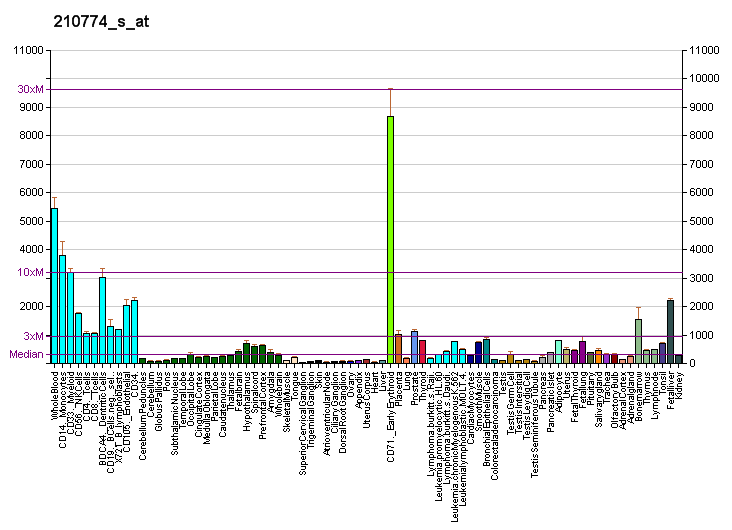
RNA expression pattern
Bgee	Human / Mouse (ortholog); Top expressed in: jejunal mucosa; trabecular bone; visceral pleura; parietal pleura; epithelium of nasopharynx; palpebral conjunctiva; gingival epithelium; tibia; kidney tubule; Epithelium of choroid plexus / Top expressed in: spermatid; spermatocyte; zygote; secondary oocyte; granulocyte; duodenum; primary oocyte; bone marrow; liver; uterus; More reference expression data
BioGPS	More reference expression data
Gene ontology
Molecular function	androgen receptor binding; transcription coactivator activity
Cellular component	nucleus; autolysosome
Biological process	androgen receptor signaling pathway; positive regulation of transcription, DNA-templated; male gonad development; transcription, DNA-templated; regulation of transcription, DNA-templated; protein targeting to lysosome; cellular iron ion homeostasis; response to hormone
Sources:Amigo / QuickGO
Orthologs
Databases	NCBI: entry; OMA: entry
Species	Human	Mouse
Entrez	8031	27057
Ensembl	ENSG00000266412	ENSMUSG00000056234
UniProt	Q13772	n/a
RefSeq (mRNA)	NM_005437; NM_001145260; NM_001145261; NM_001145262; NM_001145263	NM_001033988; NM_001284319; NM_019744
RefSeq (protein)	NP_001138732; NP_001138733; NP_001138734; NP_001138735; NP_005428	n/a
Location (UCSC)	Chr 10: 46.01 – 46.03 Mb	Chr 14: 31.88 – 31.9 Mb
PubMed search
- Wikidata
View/Edit Human	View/Edit Mouse

Nuclear receptor coactivator 4, also known as Androgen Receptor Activator (ARA70), is a protein that in humans is encoded by the NCOA4 gene. It plays an important role in ferritinophagy, acting as a cargo receptor, binding to the ferritin heavy chain and latching on to ATG8 on the surface of the autophagosome. Research has also linked that NCOA4 to erythropoiesis, ferroptosis, and iron-related neurodegenrative disease pathway.

== Function ==
NCOA4 functions as a selective cargo receptor involved in ferritinophagy, which is a form of selective autophagy responsible for ferritin degradation. NCOA4 binds ferritin heavy chain (FTH1) and delivers ferritin complexes to autophagosomes for lysosomal degration.Through regulation of ferritin turnover and intracellular iron presence, NCOA contributes to cellular iron homeostasis.

NCOA4 levels are controlled by intracellular iron concentration. Under high iron condition, NCOA4 interacts with the ubiquitin ligase HERC2 and undergoes proteasomal breakdown, lowering ferritonophagy activity.

=== Iron homeostasis ===
NCOA4 is involved in systemic iron homeostasis in a process called ferritinophagy, the autophagic clearance of ferritin, and has key roles in this process. NCOA4-deficient mouse models showed accumulation of ferritin in various organs like the spleen, liver, duodenum and bone marrow, indicative of defects in ferritin degradation. Tissue iron accumulation was found in these mice in addition to elavated serum ferritin levels, even though their intracellular iron steles to be c separated

Upon low iron intake, mice that don't have NCOA4 exhibit marked microcytic hypo chromic anemia and dyserythropoiesis with impaired provision of iron of Hb synthesis. Animal studies show that iron is not efficiently moving from ferritin stores and orthochromatic erythroblast apoptosis is enhanced in iron-deficient models. Studies on cultured cells and zebrafish also implicate NCOA4 inerythroid devlopsment nd intracellular iron availability.

Lack of NCOA4 additionally was linked to higher susceptibility to iron overload. It was shown that when mice was fed with diet supplemented with iron, those deficient NCOA4 has shown much increase of oxidative stress, liver damages and survivorship.

=== Regulation of ferritinophagy ===
Intracellular iron status regulates NCOA4-dependent ferritinophagy. When intracellular iron is plentiful, NCOA4 is ubiquitinated by the ubiquitin ligase HERC2, proteasomally degraded, thus diminishing turnover and increasing storage of intracellular iron in ferritin. Conversely, during low intracellular iron level, there is less binding to HERC2, resulting in elevated levels of NCOA4, increasing turnover and release of stored iron in ferritin. NCOA4 directly binds the heavy chain of the ferritin through a conserved C-terminal domain and this binding is required for ferritinophagy and intracellular iron pool.

== Role in disease ==
Disregulation in iron homeostasis and autophagy have further research in NCOA4-mediated ferritinophagy during neurodegenerative diseases. It is mentioned in review articles about the possible associations of NCOA4 defects, oxidative stress, ferroptosis, AD, and PD, though they have yet to demonstrate causality. Modified ferritinophagy and atypical iron accumulation has also been implicated in oxidative stress and neuron cell death in some neurodegenerative conditions. Since NCOA4 is involved in the regulation of turnover and cytoplasmic iron supply, it has been suggested as a potential component of networks underlying neurodegeneration and ferroptosis.

== Interactions ==
NCOA4 has been shown to interact with:

- Androgen receptor, and
- Peroxisome proliferator-activated receptor gamma
- Ferritin
- ATG8

== See also ==
- Transcription coregulator
