= LCOR =

Protein-coding gene in the species Homo sapiens

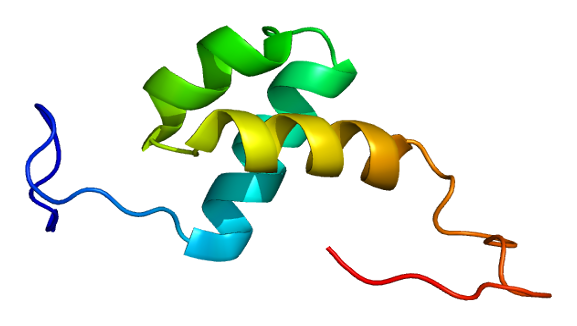

Identifiers
- Aliases: LCOR, MLR2, ligand dependent nuclear receptor corepressor, C10orf12
- External IDs: OMIM: 607698; MGI: 2443930; GeneCards: LCOR
Available structures
PDB	Ortholog search: PDBe RCSB
PDB	List of PDB id codes 2COB

Gene location (Human)
Chr.	Chromosome 10 (human)
Band	10q24.1	Start	96,832,254 bp
Band	10q24.1	End	96,995,956 bp

Gene location (Mouse)
Chr.	Chromosome 19 (mouse)
Band	19|19 C3	Start	41,471,076 bp
Band	19|19 C3	End	41,574,975 bp
RNA expression pattern
Bgee	Human / Mouse (ortholog); Top expressed in: secondary oocyte; jejunal mucosa; mucosa of paranasal sinus; mucosa of ileum; visceral pleura; cardia; pylorus; renal medulla; nipple; mucosa of sigmoid colon / Top expressed in: epithelium of stomach; ventromedial nucleus; migratory enteric neural crest cell; Rostral migratory stream; ciliary body; lateral septal nucleus; mammillary body; human fetus; retinal pigment epithelium; left colon; More reference expression data
BioGPS	n/a
Gene ontology
Molecular function	DNA binding; protein binding; DNA-binding transcription factor activity, RNA polymerase II-specific; DNA-binding transcription factor activity; transcription factor binding
Cellular component	nucleus; nucleoplasm
Biological process	regulation of transcription, DNA-templated; transcription, DNA-templated; regulation of transcription by RNA polymerase II; negative regulation of transcription by RNA polymerase II; transcription by RNA polymerase II
Sources:Amigo / QuickGO
Orthologs
Databases	NCBI: entry; OMA: entry
Species	Human	Mouse
Entrez	84458	212391
Ensembl	ENSG00000196233	ENSMUSG00000025019
UniProt	Q96JN0	Q6ZPI3
RefSeq (mRNA)	NM_001170765; NM_001170766; NM_001346516; NM_015652; NM_032440	NM_172154; NM_001370767
RefSeq (protein)	NP_001164236; NP_001164237; NP_001333445; NP_115816	NP_742166; NP_001357696
Location (UCSC)	Chr 10: 96.83 – 97 Mb	Chr 19: 41.47 – 41.57 Mb
PubMed search
- Wikidata
View/Edit Human	View/Edit Mouse

Ligand-dependent corepressor is a protein that in humans is encoded by the LCOR gene.

== Function ==
LCOR is a transcriptional corepressor widely expressed in fetal and adult tissues that is recruited to agonist-bound nuclear receptors through a single LxxLL motif, also referred to as a nuclear receptor (NR) box.
