= TEX10 =

Protein-coding gene in the species Homo sapiens

Identifiers
- Aliases: TEX10, Ipi1, bA208F1.2, testis expressed 10
- External IDs: OMIM: 616717; MGI: 1344413; GeneCards: TEX10

Gene location (Human)
| Chr. | Chromosome 9 (human) |
| Band | 9q31.1 | Start | 100,302,077 bp |
| Band | 9q31.1 | End | 100,352,942 bp |

Gene location (Mouse)
| Chr. | Chromosome 4 (mouse) |
| Band | 4|4 B1 | Start | 48,430,858 bp |
| Band | 4|4 B1 | End | 48,473,459 bp |
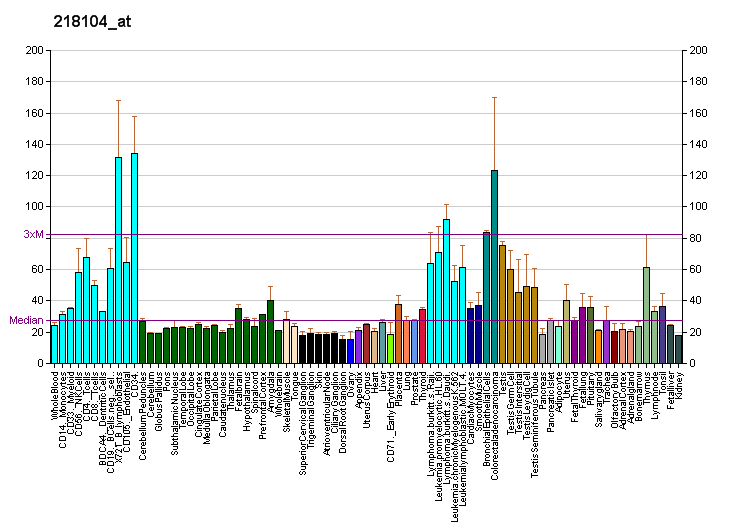
RNA expression pattern
| Bgee | Human / Mouse (ortholog); Top expressed in: ventricular zone; gonad; ganglionic eminence; testicle; sperm; Achilles tendon; cartilage tissue; endothelial cell; gastrocnemius muscle; right testis / Top expressed in: primitive streak; Gonadal ridge; internal carotid artery; external carotid artery; abdominal wall; transitional epithelium of urinary bladder; ureter; ectoderm; otic vesicle; otic placode; More reference expression data |
| BioGPS | More reference expression data |
Gene ontology
| Molecular function | protein binding |
| Cellular component | cytoplasm; MLL1 complex; nucleolus; nucleus; Rix1 complex; nucleoplasm |
| Biological process | rRNA processing |
Sources:Amigo / QuickGO
Orthologs
| Databases | NCBI: entry; OMA: entry |
| Species | Human | Mouse |
| Entrez | 54881 | 269536 |
| Ensembl | ENSG00000136891 | ENSMUSG00000028345 |
| UniProt | Q9NXF1 | Q3URQ0 |
| RefSeq (mRNA) | NM_001161584; NM_017746 | NM_172304; NM_001355740; NM_001355741 |
| RefSeq (protein) | NP_001155056; NP_060216; NP_060216.2 | NP_758508; NP_001342669; NP_001342670 |
| Location (UCSC) | Chr 9: 100.3 – 100.35 Mb | Chr 4: 48.43 – 48.47 Mb |
| PubMed search |
- Wikidata
| View/Edit Human | View/Edit Mouse |

Testis-expressed sequence 10 protein is a protein that in humans is encoded by the TEX10 gene.

TEX10 forms part of a complex with WDR18, LAS1L called the rixosome that participates in RNA degradation, ribosomal RNA (rRNA) processing and ribosome biogenesis.
