= CRTC1 =

Protein-coding gene in the species Homo sapiens

Identifiers
- Aliases: CRTC1, MECT1, TORC-1, TORC1, WAMTP1, CREB regulated transcription coactivator 1, MAML2, Mam-2
- External IDs: OMIM: 607536; MGI: 2142523; GeneCards: CRTC1

Gene location (Human)
Chr.	Chromosome 19 (human)
Band	19p13.11	Start	18,683,678 bp
Band	19p13.11	End	18,782,333 bp

Gene location (Mouse)
Chr.	Chromosome 8 (mouse)
Band	8|8 B3.3	Start	70,835,005 bp
Band	8|8 B3.3	End	70,892,229 bp
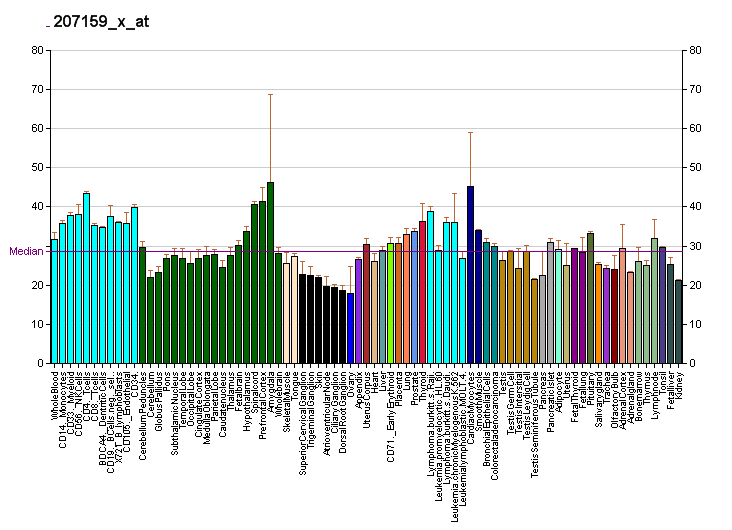
RNA expression pattern
Bgee	Human / Mouse (ortholog); Top expressed in: beta cell; paraflocculus of cerebellum; right hemisphere of cerebellum; Brodmann area 10; middle frontal gyrus; frontal pole; cerebellar vermis; right frontal lobe; nucleus accumbens; cingulate gyrus / Top expressed in: superior frontal gyrus; dentate gyrus of hippocampal formation granule cell; primary visual cortex; genital tubercle; lumbar subsegment of spinal cord; tail of embryo; neural layer of retina; cerebellar cortex; hippocampus proper; zygote; More reference expression data
BioGPS	More reference expression data
Gene ontology
Molecular function	protein binding; cAMP response element binding protein binding
Cellular component	soma; plasma membrane; dendrite; synapse; nucleus; nucleoplasm; cytoplasm; cytosol; nuclear body; postsynaptic density; glutamatergic synapse
Biological process	positive regulation of CREB transcription factor activity; viral process; positive regulation of dendrite development; memory; entrainment of circadian clock by photoperiod; protein homotetramerization; positive regulation of long-term synaptic potentiation; transcription, DNA-templated; positive regulation of transcription by RNA polymerase II; rhythmic process; regulation of transcription, DNA-templated; energy homeostasis; negative regulation of membrane hyperpolarization; postsynapse to nucleus signaling pathway
Sources:Amigo / QuickGO
Orthologs
Databases	NCBI: entry; OMA: entry
Species	Human	Mouse
Entrez	23373	382056
Ensembl	ENSG00000105662	ENSMUSG00000003575
UniProt	Q6UUV9	Q68ED7
RefSeq (mRNA)	NM_001098482; NM_015321; NM_025021	NM_001004062
RefSeq (protein)	NP_001091952; NP_056136	NP_001004062; NP_001391344; NP_001391345; NP_001391346; NP_001391347 NP_001391348; NP_001391349; NP_001391350; NP_001391351; NP_001391352; NP_001391353; NP_001391354; NP_001391355; NP_001391356; NP_001391357; NP_001391358; NP_001391359
Location (UCSC)	Chr 19: 18.68 – 18.78 Mb	Chr 8: 70.84 – 70.89 Mb
PubMed search
- Wikidata
View/Edit Human	View/Edit Mouse

CREB-regulated transcription coactivator 1 (CRTC1), previously referred to as TORC1 (Transducer Of Regulated CREB activity 1), is a protein that in humans is encoded by the CRTC1 gene. It is expressed in a limited number of tissues that include fetal brain and liver and adult heart, skeletal muscles, liver and salivary glands and various regions of the adult central nervous system.

== Clinical significance ==
Production of CRTC1 is blocked in Alzheimer's disease.

== See also ==
- Transcription coregulator
