= Histone-arginine N-methyltransferase =

Identifiers
- EC no.: 2.1.1.125
- CAS no.: 445295-80-7

Databases
- BRENDA: enzyme data
- ExPASy: NiceZyme view
- KEGG: enzyme entry
- MetaCyc: metabolic pathway
- Rhea: reactions
- PDB structures: RCSB PDB PDBe PDBsum
Search
- PMC: articles
- PubMed: articles
- NCBI: proteins

Histone-arginine N-methyltransferase (EC 2.1.1.125, histone protein methylase I, nuclear protein (histone) N-methyltransferase, protein methylase I, S-adenosyl-L-methionine:histone-arginine omega-N-methyltransferase) is an enzyme with systematic name S-adenosyl-L-methionine:histone-arginine Nomega-methyltransferase. This enzyme catalyses the following chemical reaction

S-adenosyl-L-methionine + histone-arginine $\rightleftharpoons$ S-adenosyl-L-homocysteine + histone-Nomega-methyl-arginine

The enzyme forms the Nomega-monomethyl- and Nomega, Nomega'-dimethyl.
