= Carotenoid 1,2-hydratase =

Identifiers
- EC no.: 4.2.1.131

Databases
- IntEnz: IntEnz view
- BRENDA: BRENDA entry
- ExPASy: NiceZyme view
- KEGG: KEGG entry
- MetaCyc: metabolic pathway
- PRIAM: profile
- PDB structures: RCSB PDB PDBe PDBsum
Search
- PMC: articles
- PubMed: articles
- NCBI: proteins

Carotenoid 1,2-hydratase (EC 4.2.1.131, CrtC) is an enzyme with systematic name lycopene hydro-lyase (1-hydroxy-1,2-dihydrolycopene-forming). This enzyme catalyses the following chemical reaction

(1) 1-hydroxy-1,2-dihydrolycopene $\rightleftharpoons$ lycopene + H_{2}O
(2) 1,1'-dihydroxy-1,1',2,2'-tetrahydrolycopene $\rightleftharpoons$ 1-hydroxy-1,2-dihydrolycopene + H_{2}O

In Rubrivivax gelatinosus and Thiocapsa roseopersicina both products are formed.
