= CTRC =

CTRC may refer to:

- Buffalo Central Terminal Restoration Corporation
- California Trolley and Railroad Corporation, a preserved railroad and museum in the Santa Clara valley
- Cancer Therapy & Research Center, an academic research and treatment center in Texas
- Computing-Tabulating-Recording Company, a company renamed International Business Machines in 1924
- Cyber Terror Response Center, a cybercrime section of the South Korean police
- Chymotrypsin-C, an enzyme encoded by the gene CTRC
