= ATXN7L2 =

Protein-coding gene in humans

Identifiers
- Aliases: ATXN7L2, ataxin 7 like 2
- External IDs: MGI: 1919772; GeneCards: ATXN7L2

Gene location (Human)
Chr.	Chromosome 1 (human)
Band	1p13.3	Start	109,483,479 bp
Band	1p13.3	End	109,492,804 bp

Gene location (Mouse)
Chr.	Chromosome 3 (mouse)
Band	3|3 F2.3	Start	108,109,538 bp
Band	3|3 F2.3	End	108,118,250 bp
RNA expression pattern
Bgee	Human / Mouse (ortholog); Top expressed in: right hemisphere of cerebellum; gastrocnemius muscle; muscle of thigh; right testis; left testis; right adrenal gland; right frontal lobe; right adrenal cortex; right lobe of thyroid gland; left lobe of thyroid gland / Top expressed in: ventricular zone; superior frontal gyrus; tail of embryo; primary visual cortex; ganglionic eminence; granulocyte; genital tubercle; neural layer of retina; muscle of thigh; cerebellar cortex; More reference expression data
BioGPS	n/a
Orthologs
Databases	NCBI: entry; OMA: entry
Species	Human	Mouse
Entrez	127002	72522
Ensembl	ENSG00000162650	ENSMUSG00000048997
UniProt	Q5T6C5	n/a
RefSeq (mRNA)	NM_153340; NM_001350174; NM_001350175; NM_001350177	NM_001289545; NM_175183
RefSeq (protein)	NP_699171; NP_001337103; NP_001337104; NP_001337106	n/a
Location (UCSC)	Chr 1: 109.48 – 109.49 Mb	Chr 3: 108.11 – 108.12 Mb
PubMed search
- Wikidata
View/Edit Human	View/Edit Mouse

Ataxin 7-like 2 is a protein in humans that is encoded by the ATXN7L2 gene.
