= RCOR2 =

Protein-coding gene in the species Homo sapiens

Identifiers
- Aliases: RCOR2, REST corepressor 2
- External IDs: OMIM: 616019; MGI: 1859854; GeneCards: RCOR2

Gene location (Human)
Chr.	Chromosome 11 (human)
Band	11q13.1	Start	63,911,230 bp
Band	11q13.1	End	63,917,164 bp

Gene location (Mouse)
Chr.	Chromosome 19 (mouse)
Band	19|19 A	Start	7,244,690 bp
Band	19|19 A	End	7,252,590 bp
RNA expression pattern
Bgee	Human / Mouse (ortholog); Top expressed in: ganglionic eminence; pancreatic ductal cell; ventricular zone; vena cava; right ventricle; pericardium; superior surface of tongue; pons; inferior ganglion of vagus nerve; mucosa of pharynx / Top expressed in: ventricular zone; epiblast; somite; membranous bone; tail of embryo; ganglionic eminence; Dermatocranium; mandible; otic vesicle; maxilla; More reference expression data
BioGPS	n/a
Gene ontology
Molecular function	DNA binding; transcription factor binding; DNA-binding transcription factor activity; transcription corepressor activity; enzyme binding; DNA-binding transcription factor activity, RNA polymerase II-specific; protein binding
Cellular component	transcription repressor complex; nucleus; transcription regulator complex
Biological process	regulation of transcription, DNA-templated; transcription, DNA-templated; negative regulation of transcription by RNA polymerase II; negative regulation of transcription, DNA-templated; regulation of transcription by RNA polymerase II
Sources:Amigo / QuickGO
Orthologs
Databases	NCBI: entry; OMA: entry
Species	Human	Mouse
Entrez	283248	104383
Ensembl	ENSG00000167771	ENSMUSG00000024968
UniProt	Q8IZ40	Q8C796
RefSeq (mRNA)	NM_173587; NM_001363648	NM_054048; NM_001320554
RefSeq (protein)	NP_775858; NP_001350577	NP_001307483; NP_473389
Location (UCSC)	Chr 11: 63.91 – 63.92 Mb	Chr 19: 7.24 – 7.25 Mb
PubMed search
- Wikidata
View/Edit Human	View/Edit Mouse

REST corepressor 2 also known as CoREST2 is a protein that in humans is encoded by the RCOR2 gene.

CoREST2 acts as a transcriptional corepressor protein that regulates gene expression and is required for stem cell pluripotency and neurogenesis.

== As an oncogene in neuroblastoma ==
A non-canonical role of RCoR2 (REST corepressor 2) has been described in the adrenergic lineage of neuroblastoma, expanding its established function as a transcriptional corepressor. In this context, RCOR2, driven by a super-enhancer and functionally distinct from its paralogs, can act as a positive regulator that facilitates genomics contacts between core regulatory circuitry (CRC)-bound enhancers and their target core promoters, thereby sustaining gene-expression programs that preserve adrenergic cell identity and promote tumor cell proliferation. This activating behavior challenges the traditional view of RCOR2 as exclusively part of repressive complexes and highlights the functional plasticity of HDAC containing chromatin regulators in pediatric cancers, identifying RCOR2 as a potential therapeutic vulnerability in adrenergic neuroblastoma.
