= CRTC3 =

Protein-coding gene in the species Homo sapiens

Identifiers
- Aliases: CRTC3, TORC-3, TORC3, CREB regulated transcription coactivator 3
- External IDs: OMIM: 608986; MGI: 1917711; HomoloGene: 11248; GeneCards: CRTC3; OMA:CRTC3 - orthologs

Gene location (Human)
Chr.	Chromosome 15 (human)
Band	15q26.1	Start	90,529,923 bp
Band	15q26.1	End	90,645,345 bp

Gene location (Mouse)
Chr.	Chromosome 7 (mouse)
Band	7|7 D2- D3	Start	80,236,375 bp
Band	7|7 D2- D3	End	80,338,625 bp
RNA expression pattern
Bgee	Human / Mouse (ortholog); Top expressed in: endothelial cell; saphenous vein; parotid gland; visceral pleura; urethra; inferior olivary nucleus; parietal pleura; dorsal motor nucleus of vagus nerve; nipple; popliteal artery / Top expressed in: zygote; internal carotid artery; external carotid artery; sciatic nerve; Gonadal ridge; secondary oocyte; Rostral migratory stream; genital tubercle; lacrimal gland; mesenteric lymph nodes; More reference expression data
BioGPS	n/a
Gene ontology
Molecular function	cAMP response element binding protein binding; protein binding
Cellular component	nucleus; nucleoplasm; cytoplasm; cytosol
Biological process	energy homeostasis; macrophage activation; positive regulation of CREB transcription factor activity; viral process; negative regulation of lipid catabolic process; regulation of transcription, DNA-templated; protein homotetramerization; negative regulation of cAMP-mediated signaling; transcription, DNA-templated; positive regulation of transcription by RNA polymerase II
Sources:Amigo / QuickGO
Orthologs
Species	Human	Mouse
Entrez	64784	70461
Ensembl	ENSG00000140577	ENSMUSG00000030527
UniProt	Q6UUV7	Q91X84
RefSeq (mRNA)	NM_001042574; NM_022769	NM_173863
RefSeq (protein)	NP_001036039; NP_073606	NP_776288
Location (UCSC)	Chr 15: 90.53 – 90.65 Mb	Chr 7: 80.24 – 80.34 Mb
PubMed search
- Wikidata
View/Edit Human	View/Edit Mouse

CREB-regulated transcription coactivator 3 is a protein that in humans is encoded by the CRTC3 gene.

This gene has been shown to be linked to weight gain.
