= TcoF-DB =

Biological database

Content
- Description: human transcription co-factors and transcription factor interacting proteins.

Contact
- Research center: King Abdullah University of Science and Technology
- Laboratory: Computational Bioscience Research Center
- Authors: Schaefer U, Schmeier S, Bajic VB
- Primary citation: Schaefer & al. (2011)
- Release date: 2010

Access
- Website: http://cbrc.kaust.edu.sa/tcof/

The Dragon Database for Human Transcription Co-Factors and Transcription Factor Interacting Proteins (TcoF-DB) is a database that facilitates the exploration of proteins involved in the regulation of transcription in humans by binding to regulatory DNA regions (transcription factors) and proteins involved in the regulation of transcription in humans by interacting with transcription factors and not binding to regulatory DNA regions (transcription co-factors). The database describes a total of 529 (potential) human transcription co-factors interacting with a total of 1365 human transcription factors.

== See also ==
- Transcription factor
- Transcription coregulator
