= LAS1L =

Protein-coding gene in the species Homo sapiens

Identifiers
- Aliases: LAS1L, Las1-like, dJ475B7.2, LAS1-like, ribosome biogenesis factor, LAS1 like, ribosome biogenesis factor, WTS, Las1, LAS1 like ribosome biogenesis factor, MRXSWTS
- External IDs: OMIM: 300964; MGI: 1923380; GeneCards: LAS1L

Gene location (Human)
Chr.	X chromosome (human)
Band	Xq12	Start	65,438,549 bp
Band	Xq12	End	65,534,810 bp

Gene location (Mouse)
Chr.	X chromosome (mouse)
Band	X|X C3	Start	94,978,941 bp
Band	X|X C3	End	95,000,568 bp
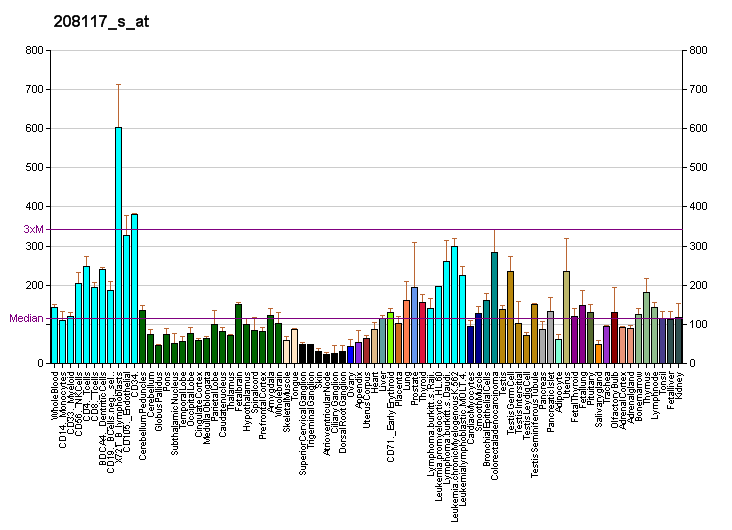
RNA expression pattern
Bgee	Human / Mouse (ortholog); Top expressed in: right hemisphere of cerebellum; right frontal lobe; C1 segment; sural nerve; right testis; left testis; putamen; cingulate gyrus; amygdala; nucleus accumbens / Top expressed in: neural layer of retina; primitive streak; epiblast; muscle of thigh; supraoptic nucleus; yolk sac; tail of embryo; superior frontal gyrus; vas deferens; transitional epithelium of urinary bladder; More reference expression data
BioGPS	More reference expression data
Gene ontology
Molecular function	RNA binding; endonuclease activity
Cellular component	MLL1 complex; nucleolus; membrane; nucleus; nucleoplasm; cytoplasm; preribosome, large subunit precursor; Las1 complex
Biological process	rRNA processing; maturation of 5.8S rRNA; maturation of LSU-rRNA; endonucleolytic cleavage involved in rRNA processing; chromatin organization; nucleic acid phosphodiester bond hydrolysis
Sources:Amigo / QuickGO
Orthologs
Databases	NCBI: entry; OMA: entry
Species	Human	Mouse
Entrez	81887	76130
Ensembl	ENSG00000001497	ENSMUSG00000057421
UniProt	Q9Y4W2	A2BE28
RefSeq (mRNA)	NM_001170649; NM_001170650; NM_031206; NM_001375328; NM_001375329 NM_001375330; NM_001375331; NM_001375332; NM_001375333; NM_001375334; NM_001375335; NM_001375336; NM_001375337	NM_152822; NM_001374717
RefSeq (protein)	NP_001164120; NP_001164121; NP_112483; NP_001362257; NP_001362258 NP_001362259; NP_001362260; NP_001362261; NP_001362262; NP_001362263; NP_001362264; NP_001362265; NP_001362266	NP_690035; NP_001361646
Location (UCSC)	Chr X: 65.44 – 65.53 Mb	Chr X: 94.98 – 95 Mb
PubMed search
- Wikidata
View/Edit Human	View/Edit Mouse

LAS1-like protein is a protein that in humans is encoded by the LAS1L gene.
