= PELP-1 =

Mammalian protein found in Homo sapiens

PELP1

Identifiers
- Aliases: PELP1, MNAR, P160, proline, glutamate and leucine rich protein 1
- External IDs: OMIM: 609455; MGI: 1922523; GeneCards: PELP1

Gene location (Human)
Chr.	Chromosome 17 (human)
Band	17p13.2	Start	4,669,774 bp
Band	17p13.2	End	4,704,337 bp

Gene location (Mouse)
Chr.	Chromosome 11 (mouse)
Band	11|11 B3	Start	70,283,709 bp
Band	11|11 B3	End	70,300,857 bp
RNA expression pattern
Bgee	Human / Mouse (ortholog); Top expressed in: tendon of biceps brachii; sural nerve; gastric mucosa; right hemisphere of cerebellum; left testis; muscle of thigh; apex of heart; right uterine tube; right testis; anterior pituitary / Top expressed in: otic vesicle; otic placode; saccule; internal carotid artery; external carotid artery; epiblast; fetal liver hematopoietic progenitor cell; Rostral migratory stream; abdominal wall; vas deferens; More reference expression data
BioGPS	n/a
Gene ontology
Molecular function	chromatin binding; transcription factor binding; protein binding; RNA binding
Cellular component	nucleus; membrane; cytoplasm; MLL1 complex; nucleoplasm; nucleolus
Biological process	positive regulation of transcription by RNA polymerase II; cellular response to estrogen stimulus; transcription, DNA-templated; rRNA processing
Sources:Amigo / QuickGO
Orthologs
Databases	NCBI: entry; OMA: entry
Species	Human	Mouse
Entrez	27043	75273
Ensembl	ENSG00000141456	ENSMUSG00000018921
UniProt	Q8IZL8	Q9DBD5
RefSeq (mRNA)	NM_014389; NM_001278241	NM_029231
RefSeq (protein)	NP_001265170; NP_055204	NP_083507
Location (UCSC)	Chr 17: 4.67 – 4.7 Mb	Chr 11: 70.28 – 70.3 Mb
PubMed search
- Wikidata
View/Edit Human	View/Edit Mouse

Proline-, glutamic acid- and leucine-rich protein 1 (PELP1) also known as modulator of non-genomic activity of estrogen receptor (MNAR) and transcription factor HMX3 is a protein that in humans is encoded by the PELP1 gene. is a transcriptional corepressor for nuclear receptors such as glucocorticoid receptors and a coactivator for estrogen receptors.

Proline-, glutamic acid-, and leucine-rich protein 1 (PELP1) is transcription coregulator and modulates functions of several hormonal receptors and transcription factors. PELP1 plays essential roles in hormonal signaling, cell cycle progression, and ribosomal biogenesis. PELP1 expression is upregulated in several cancers; its deregulation contributes to hormonal therapy resistance and metastasis; therefore, PELP1 represents a novel therapeutic target for many cancers.

== Gene ==
PELP1 is located on chromosome 17p13.2 and PELP1 is expressed in a wide variety of tissues; its highest expression levels are found in the brain, testes, ovaries, and uterus. Currently, there are two known isoforms (long 3.8 Kb and short 3.4 Kb) and short isoform is widely expressed in cancer cells.

== Structure ==
The PELP1 protein encodes a protein of 1130 amino acids, and exhibits both cytoplasmic and nuclear localization depending on the tissue. PELP1 lacks known enzymatic activity and functions as a scaffolding protein. It contains 10 NR-interacting boxes (LXXLL motifs) and functions as a coregulator of several nuclear receptors via its LXXLL motifs including ESR1, ESR2, ERR-alpha, PR, GR, AR, and RXR. PELP1 also functions as a coregulator of several other transcription factors, including AP1, SP1, NFkB, STAT3, and FHL2.

PELP1 has a histone binding domain and interacts with chromatin-modifying complexes, including CBP/p300, histone deacetylase 2, histones, SUMO2, lysine-specific demethylase 1 (KDM1), PRMT6, and CARM1. PELP1 also interacts with cell cycle regulators such as pRb. E2F1, and p53.

PELP1 is phosphorylated by hormonal and growth factor signals. PELP1 phosphorylation status is also influenced by cell cycle progression, and it is a substrate of CDKs. Further, PELP1 is phosphorylated by DNA damage induced kinases (ATM, ATR, DNA-PKcs).

== Function ==
PELP1 functions as a coactivator of several NRs and regulates genes involved in proliferation and cancer progression. PELP1 enhances transcription functions of ESR1, ESR2, AR, GR, E2F and STAT3. PELP1 participates in activation of ESR1 extra-nuclear actions by coupling ESR1 with Src kinase PI3K STAT3 ILK1 and mTOR PELP1 participates in E2-mediated cell proliferation and is a substrate of CDK4/cyclin D1, CDK2/cyclin E and CDK2/cyclin A complexes. Studies using TG mice model suggested the existence of an autocrine loop involving the CDK–cyclin D1–PELP1 axis in promoting mammary tumorigenesis

PELP1 has a histone binding domain; functions as a reader of histone modifications, interacts with epigenetic modifiers such as HDAC2, KDM1, PRMT6, CARM1; and facilitates activation of genes involved in proliferation and cancer progression. PELP1 modulates the expression of miRs, PELP1-mediated epigenetic changes play important role in the regulation miR expression and many of PELP1 mediated miRS are involved in promoting metastasis. PELP1 is needed for optimal DNA damage response, is phosphorylated by DDR kinases and is important for p53 coactivation function. PELP1 also interacts with MTp53, regulates its recruitment, and alters MTp53 target gene expression. PELP1 depletion contributes to increased stability of E2F1. PELP1 binds RNA, and participates in RNA splicing. The PELP1-regulated genome includes several uniquely spliced isoforms. Mechanistic studies showed that PELP1 interaction with the arginine methyltransferase PRMT6 plays a role in RNA splicing.

PELP1 plays critical roles in 60S ribosomal subunit synthesis and ribosomal RNA transcription. The SENP3-associated complex comprising PELP1, TEX10 and WDR18 is involved in maturation and nucleolar release of the large ribosomal subunit. SUMO conjugation/deconjugation of PELP1 controls its dynamic association with the AAA ATPase MDN1, a key factor of pre-60S remodeling. Modification of PELP1 promotes the recruitment of MDN1 to pre-60S particles, while deSUMOylation is needed to release both MDN1 and PELP1 from pre-ribosomes.

PELP1 is widely expressed in many regions of brain, including the hippocampus, hypothalamus, and cerebral cortex. PELP1 interacts with ESR1, Src, PI3K and GSK3β in the brain. It is essential for E2-mediated extra-nuclear signaling following global cerebral ischemic. PELP1 plays an essential role in E2-mediated rapid extranuclear signaling, neuroprotection, and cognitive function in the brain. Ability of E2 to exert anti-inflammatory effects was lost in PELP1 forebrain-specific knockout mice, indicating a key role for PELP1 in E2 anti-inflammatory signaling.

PELP1 is a proto-oncogene that provides cancer cells with a distinct growth and survival advantage. PELP1 interacts with various enzymes that modulate the cytoskeleton, cell migration, and metastasis. PELP1 deregulation in vivo promotes development of mammary gland hyperplasia and carcinoma PELP1 is implicated in progression of breast, endometrial, ovarian, salivary prostate, lung, pancreas, and colon neoplasms.

PELP1 signaling contributes to hormonal therapy resistance. Altered localization of PLP1 contributes to tamoxifen resistance via excessive activation of the AKT pathway and cytoplasmic PELP1 induces signaling pathways that converge on ERRγ to promote cell survival in the presence of tamoxifen. AR, PELP1 and Src form constitutive complexes in prostate neoplasms model cells that exhibit androgen independence. Cytoplasmic localization of PELP1 upregulates pro-tumorigenic IKKε and secrete inflammatory signals, which through paracrine macrophage activation, regulate the migratory phenotype associated with breast cancer initiation.

== Clinical significance ==
PELP1 is a proto-oncogene that provides cancer cells with a distinct growth and survival advantage. PELP1 overexpression has been reported in many cancers. PELP1 expression is an independent prognostic predictor of shorter breast cancer–specific survival and disease free interval. Patients whose tumors had high levels of cytoplasmic PELP1 exhibited a tendency to respond poorly to tamoxifen and PELP1 deregulated tumors respond to Src kinase and mTOR inhibitors. Treatment of breast and ovarian cancer xenografts with liposomal PELP1–siRNA–DOPC formulations revealed that knockdown of PELP1 significantly reduce the tumor growth. These results provided initial proof that PELP1 is a bonafide therapeutic target. Emerging data support a central role for PELP1 and its direct protein–protein interactions in cancer progression. Since PELP1 lacks known enzymatic activity, drugs that target PELP1 interactions with other proteins should have clinical utility. Recent studies described an inhibitor (D2) that block PELP1 interactions with AR. Since PELP1 interacts with histone modifications and epigenetic enzymes, drugs targeting epigenetic modifier enzymes may be useful in targeting PELP1 deregulated tumors.
