= Nuclear receptor coactivator 3 =

Protein found in humans

NCOA3
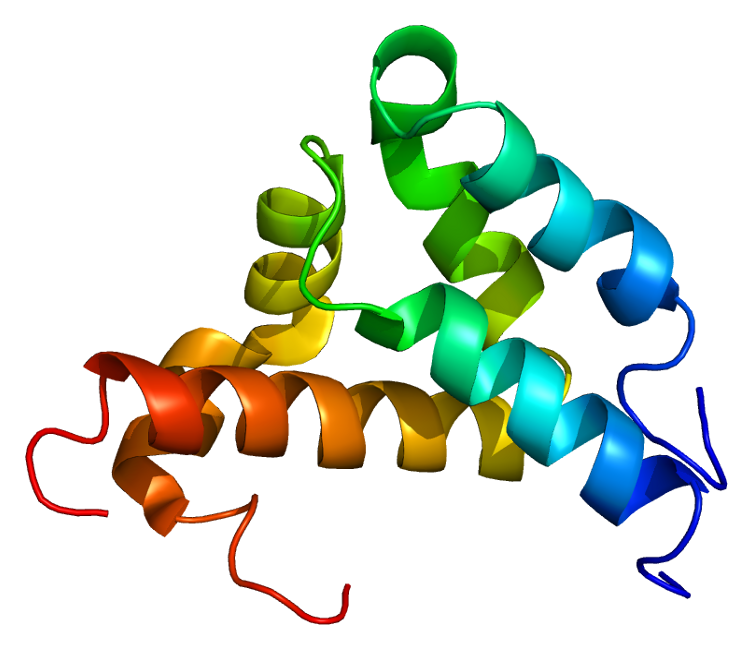

Identifiers
- Aliases: NCOA3, ACTR, AIB-1, AIB1, CAGH16, CTG26, KAT13B, RAC3, SRC-3, SRC3, TNRC14, TNRC16, TRAM-1, bHLHe42, pCIP, nuclear receptor coactivator 3
- External IDs: OMIM: 601937; MGI: 1276535; GeneCards: NCOA3
Available structures
PDB	Ortholog search: PDBe RCSB
PDB	List of PDB id codes 1KBH, 3L3X, 3L3Z
Enzyme activity
EC #	BRENDA	ExPASy	KEGG	MetaCyc
2.3.1.48	↗	↗	↗	↗

Gene location (Human)
Chr.	Chromosome 20 (human)
Band	20q13.12	Start	47,501,887 bp
Band	20q13.12	End	47,656,877 bp

Gene location (Mouse)
Chr.	Chromosome 2 (mouse)
Band	2|2 H3	Start	165,992,636 bp
Band	2|2 H3	End	166,073,242 bp
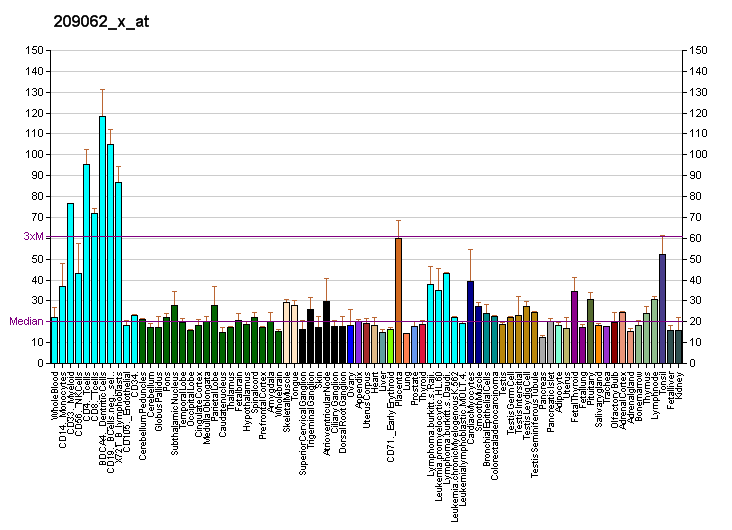

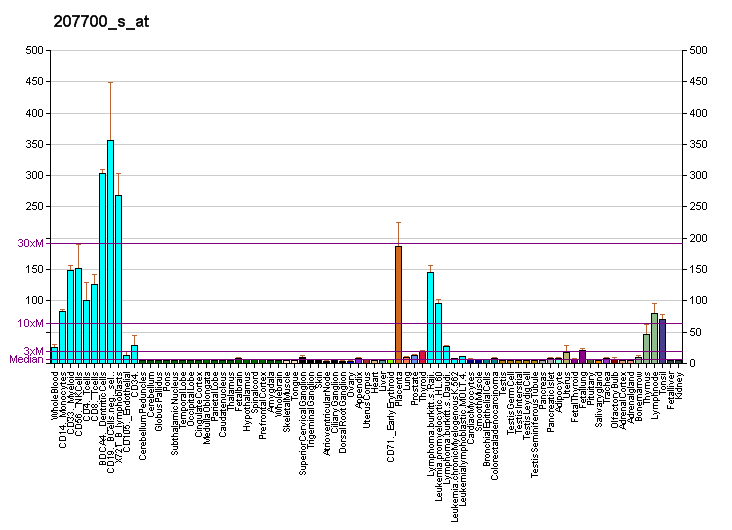

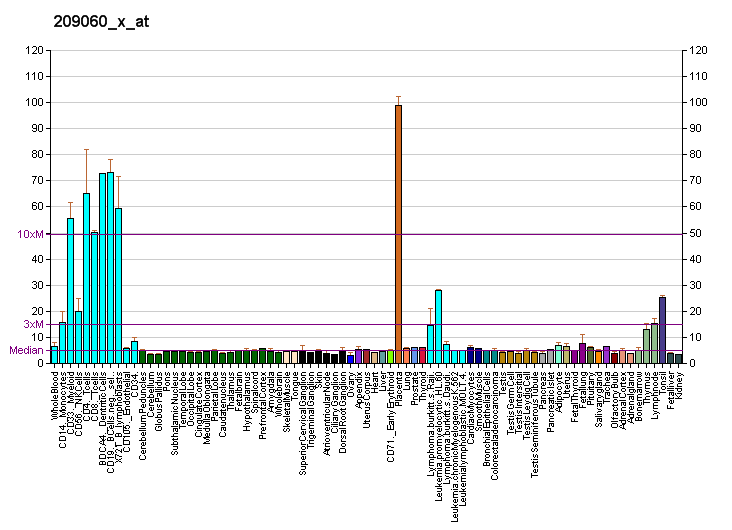
RNA expression pattern
Bgee	Human / Mouse (ortholog); Top expressed in: secondary oocyte; tendon of biceps brachii; epithelium of nasopharynx; buccal mucosa cell; nipple; superficial temporal artery; bone marrow cell; oral cavity; palpebral conjunctiva; parotid gland / Top expressed in: zygote; secondary oocyte; granulocyte; blood; medulla of thymus; ciliary body; morula; ascending aorta; primary oocyte; lacrimal gland; More reference expression data
BioGPS	More reference expression data
Gene ontology
Molecular function	transferase activity; protein dimerization activity; protein N-terminus binding; transcription coactivator activity; thyroid hormone receptor binding; histone acetyltransferase activity; protein binding; androgen receptor binding; nuclear receptor binding; nuclear receptor coactivator activity; acyltransferase activity; protein heterodimerization activity; disordered domain specific binding; RNA polymerase II complex binding; DNA-binding transcription factor activity, RNA polymerase II-specific
Cellular component	cytoplasm; nucleoplasm; extracellular exosome; nucleus; cytosol; protein-containing complex
Biological process	androgen receptor signaling pathway; regulation of RNA biosynthetic process; regulation of transcription, DNA-templated; positive regulation of keratinocyte differentiation; cellular response to estradiol stimulus; transcription, DNA-templated; positive regulation of transcription, DNA-templated; positive regulation of gene expression; positive regulation of transcription by RNA polymerase II; receptor transactivation; intracellular receptor signaling pathway; histone acetylation; cellular response to hormone stimulus; cell dedifferentiation; positive regulation of stem cell population maintenance; regulation of stem cell division
Sources:Amigo / QuickGO
Orthologs
Databases	NCBI: entry; OMA: entry
Species	Human	Mouse
Entrez	8202	17979
Ensembl	ENSG00000124151	ENSMUSG00000027678
UniProt	Q9Y6Q9	O09000
RefSeq (mRNA)	NM_181659; NM_001174087; NM_001174088; NM_006534	NM_008679; NM_001374779
RefSeq (protein)	NP_001167558; NP_001167559; NP_006525; NP_858045	n/a
Location (UCSC)	Chr 20: 47.5 – 47.66 Mb	Chr 2: 165.99 – 166.07 Mb
PubMed search
- Wikidata
View/Edit Human	View/Edit Mouse

The nuclear receptor coactivator 3 also known as NCOA3 is a protein that, in humans, is encoded by the NCOA3 gene. NCOA3 is also frequently called 'amplified in breast 1' (AIB1), steroid receptor coactivator-3 (SRC-3), or thyroid hormone receptor activator molecule 1 (TRAM-1).

== Function ==
NCOA3 is a transcriptional coactivator protein that contains several nuclear receptor interacting domains and an intrinsic histone acetyltransferase activity. NCOA3 is recruited to DNA promotion sites by ligand-activated nuclear receptors. NCOA3, in turn, acylates histones, which makes downstream DNA more accessible to transcription. Hence, NCOA3 assists nuclear receptors in the upregulation of gene expression.

== Clinical significance ==
The ratio of PAX2 to AIB-1 protein expression may be predictive of the effectiveness of tamoxifen in breast cancer treatment.

Several molecular mechanisms implicate NCOA3 (AIB1) in the endocrine therapy resistance (depicted in the figure). Signaling pathways or mutations (i.e. HER2/neu overexpression, activating mutations in PIK3CA (PI3K), activating mutations in the proto-oncogene tyrosine-protein kinase Src, etc.) that lead to persistent activation of ERK and/or PIK3CA/AKT kinase pathways result, in one hand in an enhanced AIB1 transcriptional coactivation capacity, and in the other hand in the inhibition of the proteasome-dependent AIB1 turn-over and therefore, in AIB1 overexpression. In both conditions, the equilibrium of estrogen receptor (ER) complex formation is displaced towards a transcriptionally active complex and thus, counteracting the inhibition caused by anti-estrogenic drugs such as tamoxifen or fulvestrant (selective estrogen receptor modulators). The result is the restoration of estrogen-sensitive gene transcription and the promotion of cancer progression and/or relapse.

Notably, tumors diagnosed with concomitant overexpression of AIB1 and HER2/neu have worse outcome with tamoxifen therapy than all other patients combined. In addition, dormant tumor cells of luminal breast cancers treated with endocrine therapy may acquire with time, mutations that alter kinase signalling pathways and ultimately enhance AIB1 oncogenic functions. Also, estrogen receptor-PAX2 complexes repress HER2/neu expression, but loss of PAX2 expression may result in de novo HER2/neu expression and initiate endocrine therapy resistance and relapse.

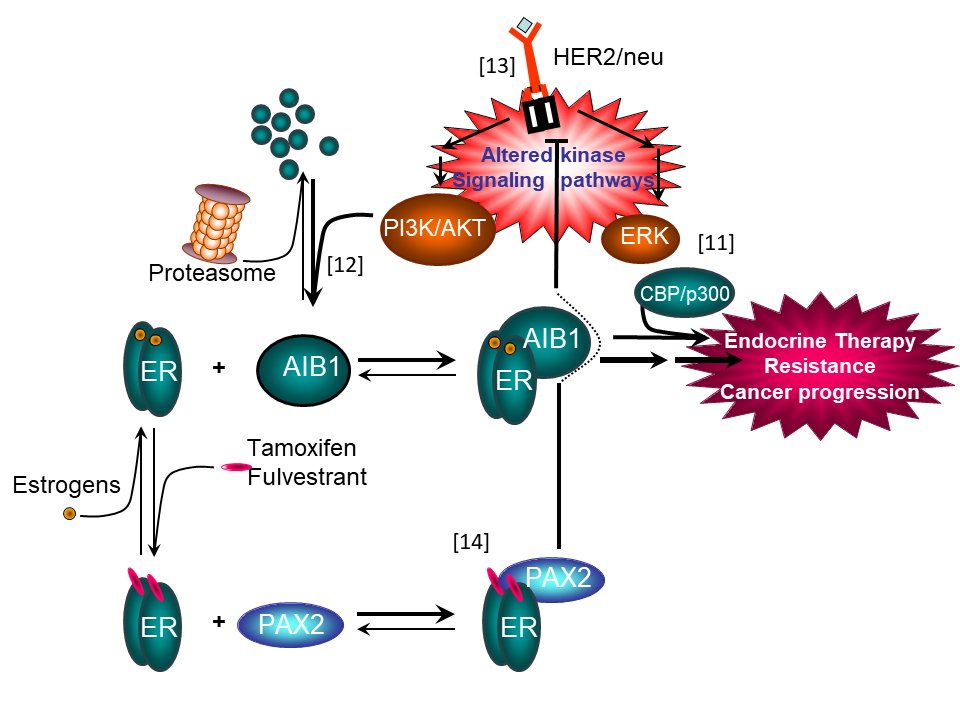
Mechanisms for AIB1-dependent anti-estrogen therapy resistance

== Interactions ==
Nuclear receptor coactivator 3 has been shown to interact with:

- Androgen receptor,
- CHUK and
- CREB-binding protein,
- Estrogen receptor alpha,
- Estrogen receptor beta,
- Glucocorticoid receptor,
- IKBKG,
- IKK2,
- Retinoid X receptor alpha.

Nuclear Factor Kappa B,
