= Nuclear receptor coactivator 1 =

Protein-coding gene in the species Homo sapiens

NCOA1
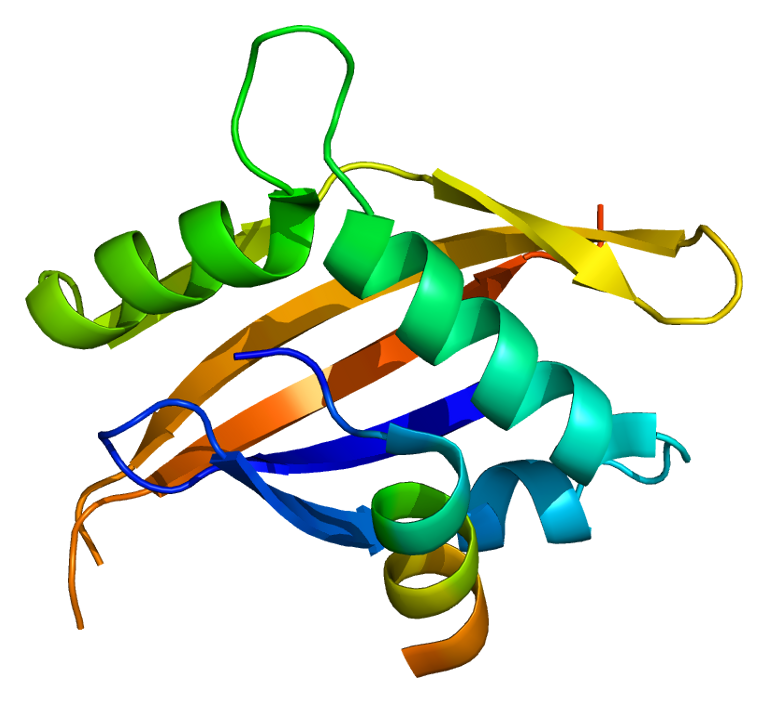

Identifiers
- Aliases: NCOA1, F-SRC-1, KAT13A, RIP160, SRC1, bHLHe42, bHLHe74, nuclear receptor coactivator 1
- External IDs: OMIM: 602691; MGI: 1276523; GeneCards: NCOA1
Available structures
PDB	Ortholog search: PDBe RCSB
PDB	List of PDB id codes 1FM6, 1FM9, 1K74, 1K7L, 1KV6, 1K4W, 1N4H, 1NQ7, 1NRL, 1P8D, 1PZL, 1RDT, 1TFC, 1U3R, 1U3S, 1X76, 1XIU, 1XV9, 1XVP, 1YY4, 1ZAF, 2A3I, 2C52, 2FVJ, 2GTK, 2HBH, 2HC4, 2HCD, 2HFP, 2NPA, 2NV7, 2P54, 2PRG, 3BEJ, 3BQD, 3CTB, 3CWD, 3DCT, 3DCU, 3DR1, 3ET1, 3ET3, 3FEI, 3FEJ, 3FUR, 3FXV, 3G8I, 3G9E, 3GYT, 3GYU, 3H0A, 3HC5, 3HC6, 3HVL, 3IPQ, 3IPS, 3IPU, 3KMR, 3LMP, 3OKH, 3OKI, 3OLF, 3OLL, 3OLS, 3OMK, 3OMM, 3OMO, 3OMP, 3OMQ, 3OOF, 3OOK, 3P88, 3P89, 3QT0, 3RUT, 3RUU, 3RVF, 3S9S, 3T03, 3UU7, 3UUA, 3UUD, 3V9Y, 3VN2, 4DK7, 4DK8, 4DM6, 4DM8, 4DQM, 4F9M, 4FGY, 4G1D, 4G1Y, 4G1Z, 4G20, 4G21, 4G2H, 4HEE, 4J5X, 4JYG, 4JYH, 4JYI, 4MG5, 4MG6, 4MG7, 4MG8, 4MG9, 4MGA, 4MGB, 4MGC, 4MGD, 4TUZ, 4TV1, 5AVI, 5AVL, 4Y29, 4RUJ, 4RUP, 5A86, 5E7V, 4UDB, 4UDA, 5AZT, 5HJS
Enzyme activity
EC #	BRENDA	ExPASy	KEGG	MetaCyc
2.3.1.48	↗	↗	↗	↗

Gene location (Human)
Chr.	Chromosome 2 (human)
Band	2p23.3	Start	24,491,254 bp
Band	2p23.3	End	24,770,702 bp

Gene location (Mouse)
Chr.	Chromosome 12 (mouse)
Band	12|12 A1.1	Start	4,247,362 bp
Band	12|12 A1.1	End	4,477,182 bp
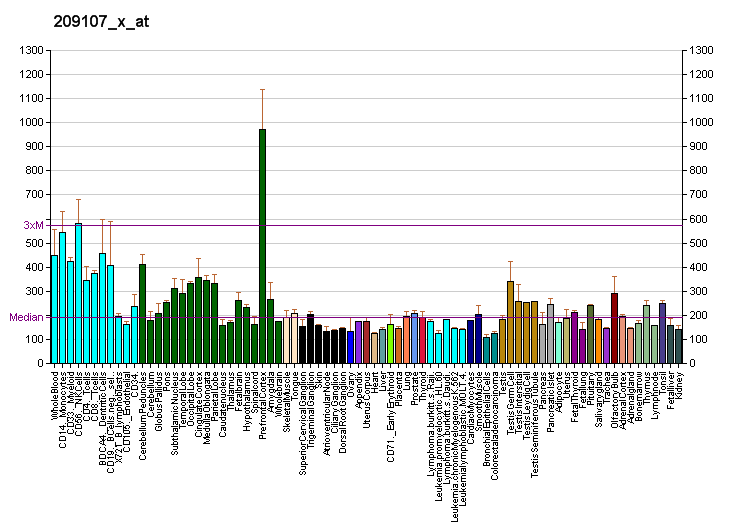

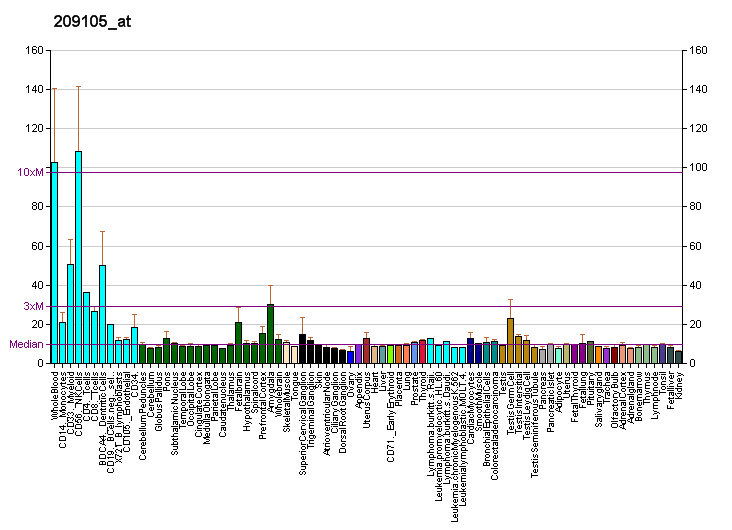

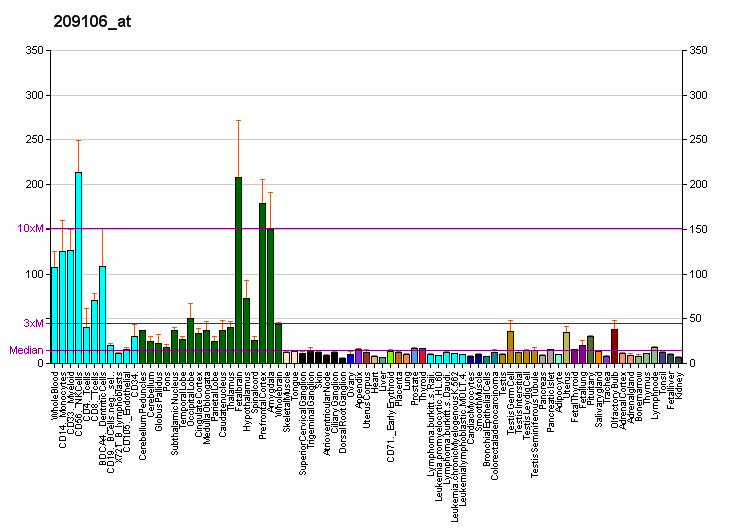
RNA expression pattern
Bgee	Human / Mouse (ortholog); Top expressed in: middle temporal gyrus; middle frontal gyrus; paraflocculus of cerebellum; Brodmann area 23; entorhinal cortex; tibialis anterior muscle; postcentral gyrus; frontal pole; endothelial cell; Region I of hippocampus proper / Top expressed in: Rostral migratory stream; retinal pigment epithelium; lateral septal nucleus; dentate gyrus of hippocampal formation granule cell; lateral geniculate nucleus; anterior amygdaloid area; motor neuron; ventromedial nucleus; mammillary body; subiculum; More reference expression data
BioGPS	More reference expression data
Gene ontology
Molecular function	transferase activity; DNA binding; transcription coactivator activity; protein dimerization activity; protein N-terminus binding; transcription factor binding; chromatin binding; histone acetyltransferase activity; protein binding; androgen receptor binding; enzyme binding; acyltransferase activity; nuclear receptor coactivator activity; aryl hydrocarbon receptor binding; nuclear receptor binding; estrogen receptor binding; DNA-binding transcription factor activity, RNA polymerase II-specific; progesterone receptor binding; retinoic acid receptor binding; protein-containing complex binding; retinoid X receptor binding
Cellular component	nucleus; nucleoplasm; cytosol; plasma membrane; protein-containing complex; cytoplasm; neuron projection
Biological process	androgen receptor signaling pathway; regulation of RNA biosynthetic process; regulation of transcription, DNA-templated; cellular response to Thyroglobulin triiodothyronine; regulation of cellular response to drug; transcription, DNA-templated; positive regulation of transcription, DNA-templated; labyrinthine layer morphogenesis; positive regulation of neuron differentiation; bile acid and bile salt transport; positive regulation of apoptotic process; histone H4 acetylation; regulation of thyroid hormone mediated signaling pathway; positive regulation of transcription by RNA polymerase II; intracellular receptor signaling pathway; positive regulation of transcription from RNA polymerase II promoter by galactose; regulation of lipid metabolic process; transcription by RNA polymerase II; cellular response to hormone stimulus; lactation; male gonad development; response to hormone; cerebellum development; hippocampus development; hypothalamus development; cerebral cortex development; response to estradiol; response to retinoic acid; response to progesterone; estrous cycle; positive regulation of female receptivity; male mating behavior
Sources:Amigo / QuickGO
Orthologs
Databases	NCBI: entry; OMA: entry
Species	Human	Mouse
Entrez	8648	17977
Ensembl	ENSG00000084676	ENSMUSG00000020647
UniProt	Q15788	P70365
RefSeq (mRNA)	NM_003743; NM_147223; NM_147233; NM_001362950; NM_001362952 NM_001362954; NM_001362955	NM_010881
RefSeq (protein)	NP_003734; NP_671756; NP_671766; NP_001349879; NP_001349881 NP_001349883; NP_001349884	NP_035011
Location (UCSC)	Chr 2: 24.49 – 24.77 Mb	Chr 12: 4.25 – 4.48 Mb
PubMed search
- Wikidata
View/Edit Human	View/Edit Mouse

The nuclear receptor coactivator 1 (NCOA1), also called steroid receptor coactivator-1 (SRC-1), is a transcriptional coregulatory protein that contains several nuclear receptor–interacting domains and possesses intrinsic histone acetyltransferase activity. It is encoded by the gene NCOA1.

NCOA1 is recruited to DNA promoter sites by ligand-activated nuclear receptors. NCOA1, in turn, acylates histones, which makes downstream DNA more accessible to transcription. Hence, NCOA1 assists nuclear receptors in the upregulation of DNA expression as a coactivator.

== Interactions ==
Nuclear receptor coactivator 1 possesses a basic helix-loop-helix (bHLH) domain and has been shown to interact with:

- Androgen receptor,
- C-Fos,
- C-jun,
- CIITA,
- CREB-binding protein,
- Cyclin D1,
- Estrogen receptor alpha,
- Glucocorticoid receptor,
- NFKB1,
- PCAF,
- PPARGC1A,
- Peroxisome proliferator-activated receptor alpha,
- SNW1,
- STAT3,
- STAT6,
- TRIP4, and
- Thyroid hormone receptor beta.
