= GATA1 =

Protein-coding gene in humans

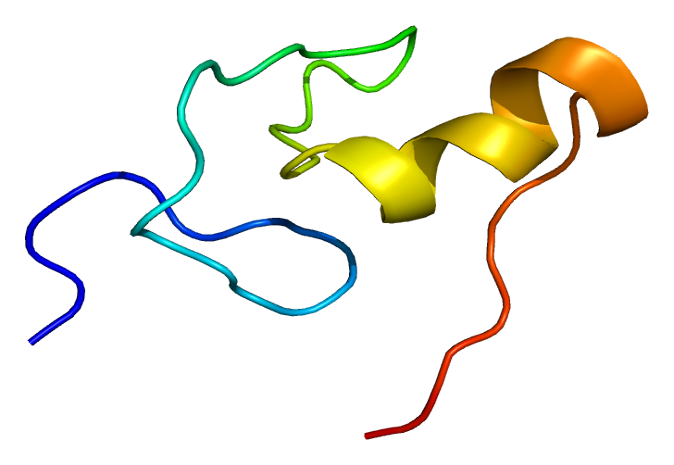

Identifiers
- Aliases: GATA1, ERYF1, GATA-1, GF-1, GF1, NF-E1, NFE1, XLANP, XLTDA, XLTT, GATA binding protein 1
- External IDs: OMIM: 305371; MGI: 95661; GeneCards: GATA1
Available structures
| PDB | Ortholog search: PDBe RCSB |
| PDB | List of PDB id codes 1GNF, 1Y0J, 2L5E, 2L6Y, 2L6Z, 3VD6, 3VEK |

Gene location (Human)
| Chr. | X chromosome (human) |
| Band | Xp11.23 | Start | 48,786,540 bp |
| Band | Xp11.23 | End | 48,794,311 bp |

Gene location (Mouse)
| Chr. | X chromosome (mouse) |
| Band | X A1.1|X 3.59 cM | Start | 7,825,499 bp |
| Band | X A1.1|X 3.59 cM | End | 7,844,310 bp |
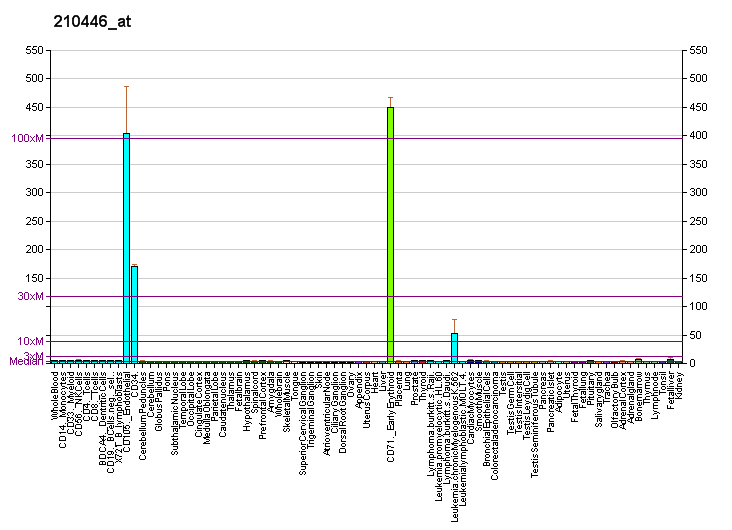
RNA expression pattern
| Bgee | Human / Mouse (ortholog); Top expressed in: trabecular bone; blood; bone marrow; monocyte; bone marrow cell; granulocyte; right lung; upper lobe of left lung; spleen; gallbladder / Top expressed in: fetal liver hematopoietic progenitor cell; tibiofemoral joint; blood; embryo; morula; yolk sac; spleen; bone marrow; body of femur; human fetus; More reference expression data |
| BioGPS | More reference expression data |
Gene ontology
| Molecular function | C2H2 zinc finger domain binding; transcription cis-regulatory region binding; sequence-specific DNA binding; RNA polymerase II core promoter sequence-specific DNA binding; DNA binding; p53 binding; DNA binding, bending; chromatin DNA binding; DNA-binding transcription activator activity, RNA polymerase II-specific; cis-regulatory region sequence-specific DNA binding; RNA polymerase II transcription regulatory region sequence-specific DNA binding; protein binding; RNA polymerase II cis-regulatory region sequence-specific DNA binding; chromatin binding; DNA-binding transcription factor activity; DNA-binding transcription repressor activity, RNA polymerase II-specific; zinc ion binding; metal ion binding; DNA-binding transcription factor activity, RNA polymerase II-specific |
| Cellular component | nucleus; nucleoplasm; transcription repressor complex; transcription regulator complex; protein-DNA complex |
| Biological process | negative regulation of cell population proliferation; negative regulation of transcription regulatory region DNA binding; eosinophil fate commitment; in utero embryonic development; regulation of glycoprotein biosynthetic process; cellular response to thyroid hormone stimulus; blood coagulation; erythrocyte differentiation; platelet formation; positive regulation of osteoblast proliferation; transcription by RNA polymerase II; platelet aggregation; negative regulation of extrinsic apoptotic signaling pathway in absence of ligand; regulation of transcription, DNA-templated; regulation of primitive erythrocyte differentiation; positive regulation of transcription, DNA-templated; regulation of definitive erythrocyte differentiation; cell-cell signaling; embryonic hemopoiesis; cell development; positive regulation of erythrocyte differentiation; positive regulation of transcription by RNA polymerase II; megakaryocyte differentiation; dendritic cell differentiation; positive regulation of peptidyl-tyrosine phosphorylation; negative regulation of bone mineralization; negative regulation of transcription by RNA polymerase II; male gonad development; myeloid cell differentiation; negative regulation of apoptotic process; homeostasis of number of cells within a tissue; transcription, DNA-templated; basophil differentiation; eosinophil differentiation; erythrocyte development; regulation of megakaryocyte differentiation; regulation of hematopoietic stem cell differentiation; development of the heart; animal organ morphogenesis; tissue development; anatomical structure formation involved in morphogenesis; digestive tract development |
Sources:Amigo / QuickGO
Orthologs
| Databases | NCBI: entry; OMA: entry |
| Species | Human | Mouse |
| Entrez | 2623 | 14460 |
| Ensembl | ENSG00000102145 | ENSMUSG00000031162 |
| UniProt | P15976 | P17679 |
| RefSeq (mRNA) | NM_002049 | NM_008089 |
| RefSeq (protein) | NP_002040 | NP_032115 |
| Location (UCSC) | Chr X: 48.79 – 48.79 Mb | Chr X: 7.83 – 7.84 Mb |
| PubMed search |
- Wikidata
| View/Edit Human | View/Edit Mouse |

GATA-binding factor 1 or GATA-1 (also termed Erythroid transcription factor) is the founding member of the GATA family of transcription factors. This protein is widely expressed throughout vertebrate species. In humans and mice, it is encoded by the GATA1 and Gata1 genes, respectively. These genes are located on the X chromosome in both species.

GATA1 regulates the expression (i.e. formation of the genes' products) of an ensemble of genes that mediate the development of red blood cells and platelets. Its critical roles in red blood cell formation include promoting the maturation of precursor cells, e.g. erythroblasts, to red blood cells and stimulating these cells to erect their cytoskeleton and biosynthesize their oxygen-carrying components viz., hemoglobin and heme. GATA1 plays a similarly critical role in the maturation of blood platelets from megakaryoblasts, promegakaryocytes, and megakaryocytes; the latter cells then shed membrane-enclosed fragments of their cytoplasm, i.e. platelets, into the blood.

In consequence of the vital role that GATA1 has in the proper maturation of red blood cells and platelets, inactivating mutations in the GATA1 gene (i.e. mutations that result in the production of no, reduced levels of, or a less active GATA1) cause X chromosome-linked anemic and/or bleeding diseases due to the reduced formation and functionality of red blood cells and/or platelets, respectively, or, under certain circumstances, the pathological proliferation of megakaryoblasts. These diseases include transient myeloproliferative disorder occurring in Down syndrome, acute megakaryoblastic leukemia occurring in Down syndrome, Diamond–Blackfan anemia, and various combined anemia-thrombocytopenia syndromes including a gray platelet syndrome-type disorder.

Reduced levels of GATA1 due to reductions in the translation of GATA1 mRNA into its transcription factor product are associated with promoting the progression of myelofibrosis, i.e. a malignant disease that involves the replacement of bone marrow cells by fibrous tissue and extramedullary hematopoiesis, i.e. the extension of blood cell-forming cells to sites outside of the bone marrow.

== Gene ==
The human GATA1 gene is located on the short (i.e. "p") arm of the X chromosome at position 11.23. It is 7.74 kilobases in length, consists of 6 exons, and codes for a full-length protein, GATA1, of 414 amino acids as well as a shorter one, GATA1-S. GATA1-S lacks the first 83 amino acids of GATA1 and therefore consists of only 331 amino acids. GATA1 codes for two zinc finger structural motifs, C-ZnF and N-ZnF, that are present in both GATA1 and GATA1-S proteins. These motifs are critical for both transcription factors' gene-regulating actions. N-ZnF is a frequent site of disease-causing mutations. Lacking the first 83 amino acids and therefore one of the two activation domains of GATA1, GATA1-S has significantly less gene-regulating activity than GATA1.

Studies in Gata1-knockout mice, i.e. mice lacking the Gata1 gene, indicate that this gene is essential for the development and maintenance of blood-based and/or tissue-based hematological cells, particularly red blood cells and platelets but also eosinophils, basophils, mast cells, and dendritic cells. The knock-out mice die by day 11.5 of their embryonic development due to severe anemia that is associated with absence of cells of the red blood cell lineage, excessive numbers of malformed platelet-precursor cells, and an absence of platelets. These defects reflect the essential role of Gata-1 in stimulating the development, self-renewal, and/or maturation of red blood cell and platelet precursor cells. Studies using mice depleted of their Gata1 gene during adulthood show that: 1) Gata1 is required for the stimulation of erythropoiesis (i.e. increase in red blood cell formation) in response to stress and 2) Gata1-deficient adult mice invariably develop a form of myelofibrosis.

== GATA1 proteins ==
In both GATA1 and GATA1-S, C-ZnF (i.e. C-terminus zinc finger) binds to DNA-specific nucleic acid sequences sites viz., (T/A(GATA)A/G), on the expression-regulating sites of its target genes and in doing so either stimulates or suppresses the expression of these target genes. Their N-ZnF (i.e. N-terminus zinc fingers) interacts with an essential transcription factor-regulating nuclear protein, FOG1. FOG1 powerfully promotes or suppresses the actions that the two transcription factors have on most of their target genes. Similar to the knockout of Gata1, knockout of the mouse gene for FOG1, Zfpm1, causes total failure of red blood cell development and embryonic lethality by day 11.5. Based primarily on mouse studies, it is proposed that the GATA1-FOG1 complex promotes human erythropoiesis by recruiting and binding with at least two gene expression-regulating complexes, Mi-2/NuRD complex (a chromatin remodeler) and CTBP1 (a histone deacetylase) and three gene expression-regulating proteins, SET8 (a GATA1-inhibiting histone methyltransferase), BRG1 (a transcription activator), and Mediator (a transcription co-activator). Other interactions include those with: BRD3 (remodels DNA nucleosomes), BRD4 (binds acetylated lysine residues in DNA-associated histone to regulate gene accessibility), FLI1 (a transcription factor that blocks erythroid differentiation), HDAC1 (a histone deacetylase), LMO2 (regulator of erythrocyte development), ZBTB16 (transcription factor regulating cell cycle progression), TAL1 (a transcription factor), FOG2 (a transcription factor regulator), and GATA2 (Displacement of GATA2 by GATA1, i.e. the "GATA switch", at certain gene-regulating sites is critical for red blood development in mice and, presumably, humans). GATA1-FOG1 and GATA2-FOG1 interactions are critical for platelet formation in mice and may similarly be critical for this in humans.

Other types of GATA2 mutations cause the over-expression of the GATA2 transcription factor. This overexpression is associated with the development of non-familial AML. Apparently, the GATA2 gene's expression level must be delicately balanced between deficiency and excess in order to avoid life-threatening disease.

== Physiology and Pathology ==
GATA1 was first described as a transcription factor that activates the hemoglobin B gene in the red blood cell precursors of chickens. Subsequent studies in mice and isolated human cells found that GATA1 stimulates the expression of genes that promote the maturation of precursor cells (e.g. erythroblasts) to red blood cells while silencing genes that cause these precursors to proliferate and thereby to self-renew. GATA1 stimulates this maturation by, for example, inducing the expression of genes in erythroid cells that contribute to the formation of their cytoskeleton and that make enzymes necessary for the biosynthesis of hemoglobins and heme, the oxygen-carrying components of red blood cells. GATA1-inactivating mutations may thereby result in a failure to produce sufficient numbers of and/or fully functional red blood cells. Also based on mouse and isolated human cell studies, GATA1 appears to play a similarly critical role in the maturation of platelets from their precursor cells. This maturation involves the stimulation of megakaryoblasts to mature ultimately to megakaryocytes which cells shed membrane-enclosed fragments of their cytoplasm, i.e. platelets, into the blood. GATA1-inactivating mutations may thereby result in reduced levels of and/or dysfunctional blood platelets.

Reduced levels of GATA1 due to defective translation of GATA1 mRNA in human megakaryocytes is associated with myelofibrosis, i.e. the replacement of bone marrow cells by fibrous tissue. Based primarily on mouse and isolated human cell studies, this myelofibrosis is thought to result from the accumulation of platelet precursor cells in the bone marrow and their release of excessive amounts of cytokines that stimulate bone marrow stromal cells to become fiber-secreting fibroblasts and osteoblasts. Based on mouse studies, low GATA1 levels are also thought to promote the development of splenic enlargement and extramedullary hematopoiesis in human myelofibrosis disease. These effects appear to result directly from the over-proliferation of abnormal platelet precursor cells.

The clinical features associated with inactivating GATA1 mutations or other causes of reduced GATA1 levels vary greatly with respect not only to the types of disease exhibited but also to disease severity. This variation depends on at least four factors. First, inactivating mutations in GATA1 cause X-linked recessive diseases. Males, with only one GATA1 gene, experience the diseases of these mutations while women, with two GATA1 genes, experience no or extremely mild evidence of these diseases unless they have inactivating mutations in both genes or their mutation is dominant negative, i.e. inhibiting the good gene's function. Second, the extent to which a mutation reduces the cellular levels of fully functional GATA1 correlates with disease severity. Third, inactivating GATA1 mutations can cause different disease manifestations. For example, mutations in GATA1's N-ZnF that interfere with its interaction with FOG1 result in reduced red blood cell and platelet levels whereas mutations in N-ZnF that reduce its binding affinity to target genes cause a reduction in red blood cells plus thalassemia-type and porphyria-type symptoms. Fourth, the genetic background of individuals can impact the type and severity of symptoms. For example, GATA1-inactivating mutations in individuals with the extra chromosome 21 of Down syndrome exhibit a proliferation of megakaryoblasts that infiltrate and consequentially directly damage liver, heart, marrow, pancreas, and skin plus secondarily life-threatening damage to the lungs and kidneys. These same individuals can develop secondary mutations in other genes that results in acute megakaryoblastic leukemia.

== Genetic disorders ==
GATA1 gene mutations are associated with the development of various genetic disorders which may be familial (i.e. inherited) or newly acquired. In consequence of its X chromosome location, GATA1 mutations generally have a far greater physiological and clinical impact in men, who have only one X chromosome along with its GATA1 gene, than woman, who have two of these chromosomes and genes: GATA1 mutations lead to X-linked diseases occurring predominantly in males. Mutations in the activation domain of GATA1 (GATA1-S lacks this domain) are associated with the transient myeloproliferative disorder and acute megakaryoblastic leukemia of Down syndrome while mutations in the N-ZnF motif of GATA1 and GATA1-S are associated with diseases similar to congenital dyserythropoietic anemia, congenital thrombocytopenia, and certain features that occur in thalassemia, gray platelet syndrome, congenital erythropoietic porphyria, and myelofibrosis.

=== Down syndrome-related disorders ===
==== Transient myeloproliferative disorder ====
Acquired inactivating mutations in the activation domain of GATA1 are the apparent cause of the transient myeloproliferative disorder that occurs in individuals with Down syndrome. These mutations are frameshifts in exon 2 that result in the failure to make GATA1 protein, continued formation of GATA1-S, and therefore a greatly reduced ability to regulate GATA1-targeted genes. The presence of these mutations is restricted to cells bearing the trisomy 21 karyotype (i.e. extra chromosome 21) of Down syndrome: GATA1 inactivating mutations and trisomy 21 are necessary and sufficient for development of the disorder. Transient myeloproliferative disorder consists of a relatively mild but pathological proliferation of platelet-precursor cells, primarily megakaryoblasts, which often show an abnormal morphology that resembles immature myeloblasts (i.e. unipotent stem cells which differentiate into granulocytes and are the malignant proliferating cell in acute myeloid leukemia). Phenotype analyses indicate that these blasts belong to the megakaryoblast series. Abnormal findings include the frequent presence of excessive blast cell numbers, reduced platelet and red blood cell levels, increased circulating white blood cell levels, and infiltration of platelet-precursor cells into the bone marrow, liver, heart, pancreas, and skin. The disorder is thought to develop in utero and is detected at birth in about 10% of individuals with Down syndrome. It resolves totally within ~3 months but in the following 1–3 years progresses to acute megakaryoblastic leukemia in 20% to 30% of these individuals: transient myeloprolierative disorder is a clonal (abnormal cells derived from single parent cells), pre-leukemic condition and is classified as a myelodysplastic syndrome disease.

==== Acute megakaryoblastic leukemia ====
Acute megakaryoblastic leukemia is a subtype of acute myeloid leukemia that is extremely rare in adults and, although still rare, more common in children. The childhood disease is classified into two major subgroups based on its occurrence in individuals with or without Down syndrome. The disease in Down syndrome occurs in 20% to 30% of individuals who previously had transient myeloproliferative disorder. Their GATA1 mutations are frameshifts in exon 2 that result in the failure to make GATA1 protein, continued formation of GATA1-S, and thus a greatly reduced ability to regulate GATA1-targeted genes. Transient myeloproliferative disorder is detected at or soon after birth and generally resolves during the next months but is followed within 1–3 years by acute megakaryoblastic leukemia. During this 1-3 year interval, individuals accumulate multiple somatic mutations in cells bearing inactivating GATA1 mutations plus trisomy 21. These mutations are thought to result from the uncontrolled proliferation of blast cells caused by the GATAT1 mutation in the presence of the extra chromosome 21 and to be responsible for progression of the transient disorder to leukemia. The mutations occur in one or, more commonly, multiple genes including: TP53, RUNX1, FLT3, ERG, DYRK1A, CHAF1B, HLCS, CTCF, STAG2, RAD21, SMC3, SMC1A, NIPBL, SUZ12, PRC2, JAK1, JAK2, JAK3, MPL, KRAS, NRAS, SH2B3, and MIR125B2 which is the gene for microRNA MiR125B2.

=== Diamond–Blackfan anemia ===
Diamond–Blackfan anemia is a familial (i.e. inherited) (45% of cases) or acquired (55% of cases) genetic disease that presents in infancy or, less commonly, later childhood as aplastic anemia and the circulation of abnormally enlarged red blood cells. Other types of blood cell and platelets circulate at normal levels and appear normal in structure. About half of affected individuals have various birth defects. The disease is regarded as a uniformly genetic disease although the genes causing it have not been identified in ~30% of cases. In virtually all the remaining cases, autosomal recessive inactivating mutations occur in any one of 20 of the 80 genes encoding ribosomal proteins. About 90% of the latter mutations occur in 6 ribosomal protein genes viz., RPS19, RPL5, RPS26, RPL11, RPL35A, and RPS24. However, several cases of familial Diamond–Blackfan anemia have been associated with GATA1 gene mutations in the apparent absence of a mutation in ribosomal protein genes. These GATA1 mutations occur in an exon 2 splice site or the start codon of GATA1, cause the production of the GATA1-S in the absence of the GATA1 transcription factor, and therefore are gene-inactivating in nature. It is proposed that these GATA1 mutations are a cause for Diamond Blackfan anemia.

=== Combined anemia-thrombocytopenia syndromes ===
Certain GATA1-inactivating mutations are associated with familial or, less commonly, sporadic X-linked disorders that consist of anemia and thrombocytopenia due to a failure in the maturation of red blood cell and platelet precursors plus other hematological abnormalities. These GATA1 mutations are identified by an initial letter identifying the normal amino acid followed by a number giving the position of this amino acid in GATA1, followed by a final letter identifying the amino acid substituted for the normal one. The amino acids are identified as V=valine; M=methionine; G=glycine; S=serine, D=aspartic acid; Y=tyrosine, R=arginine; W=tryptophan, Q=glutamine). These mutations and some key abnormalities they cause are:

- V205M: familial disease characterized by severe anemia in fetuses and newborns; bone marrow has increased numbers of malformed platelet and red blood cell precursors.
- G208S and D218G: familial disease characterized by severe bleeding, reduced number of circulating platelets which are malformed (i.e. enlarged), and mild anemia.
- D218Y: familial disease similar to but more severe that the disease cause by G209S and D218G mutations.
- R216W: characterized by a beta thalassemia-type disease, i.e. microcytic anemia, absence of hemoglobin B, and hereditary persistence of fetal hemoglobin; symptoms of congenital erythropoietic porphyria; mild to moderately severe thrombocytopenia with features of the gray platelet syndrome.
- R216Q: familial disease characterized by mild anemia with features of heterozygous rather than homozygous (i.e. overt) beta thalassemia; mild thrombocytopenia with features of the gray platelet syndrome.
- G208R: disease characterized by mild anemia and severe thrombocytopenia with malformed erythroblasts and megakaryoblasts in the bone marrow. Structural features of these cells were similar to those observed in congenital dyserythropoietic anemia.
- -183G>A: rare Single-nucleotide polymorphism (rs113966884) in which the nucleotide adenine replaces guanine in DNA at the position 183 nucleotides upstream of the start of GATA1; disorder characterized as mild anemia with structural features in bone marrow red cell precursors similar to those observed in congenital dyserythropoietic anemia.

The Gray platelet syndrome is a rare congenital bleeding disorder caused by reductions or absence of alpha-granules in platelets. Alpha-granules contain various factors which contribute to blood clotting and other functions. In their absence, platelets are defective. The syndrome is commonly considered to result solely from mutations in the NBEAL2 gene located on human chromosome 3 at position p21. In these cases, the syndrome follows autosomal recessive inheritance, causes a mild to moderate bleeding tendency, and may be accompanied by a defect in the secretion of the granule contents in neutrophils. There are other causes for a congenital platelet alpha-granule-deficient bleeding disorder viz., the autosomal recessive disease of Arc syndrome caused by mutations in either the VPS33B (on human chromosome 15 at q26) or VIPAS39 (on chromosome 14 at q34); the autosomal dominant disease of GFI1B-related syndrome caused by mutations in GFI1B (located on human chromosome 9 at q34); and the disease caused by R216W and R216Q mutations in GATA1. The GATA1 mutation-related disease resembles the one caused by NBEAL2 mutations in that it is associated with the circulation of a reduced number (i.e. thrombocytopenia) of abnormally enlarged (i.e. macrothrombocytes), alpha-granule deficient platelets. It differs from the NBEAL2-induced disease in that it is X chromosome-linked, accompanied by a moderately severe bleeding tendency, and associated with abnormalities in red blood cells (e.g. anemia, a thalassemia-like disorder due to unbalanced hemoglobin production, and/or a porphyria-like disorder. A recent study found that GATA1 is a strong enhancer of NBEAL2 expression and that the R216W and R216Q inactivating mutations in GATA1 may cause the development of alpha granule-deficient platelets by failing to stimulate the expression of NBDAL2 protein. Given these differences, the GATA1 mutation-related disorder appears better classified as clinically and pathologically different than the gray platelet syndrome.

== GATA1 in myelofibrosis ==
Myelofibrosis is a rare hematological malignancy characterized by progressive fibrosis of the bone marrow, extramedullary hematopoiesis (i.e. formation of blood cells outside of their normal site in the bone marrow), variable reductions in the levels of circulating blood cells, increases in the circulating levels of the precursors to the latter cells, abnormalities in platelet precursor cell maturation, and the clustering of grossly malformed megakaryocytes in the bone marrow. Ultimately, the disease may progress to leukemia. Recent studies indicate that the megakaryocytes but not other cell types in rare cases of myelofibrosis have greatly reduced levels of GATA1 as a result of a ribosomal deficiency in translating GATA1 mRNA into GATA1 transcription factor. The studies suggest that these reduced levels of GATA1 contribute to the progression of myelofibrosis by leading to an impairment in platelet precursor cell maturation, by promoting extramedullary hematopoiesis, and, possibly, by contributing to its leukemic transformation.
