= ZFPM2 =

Protein-coding gene in the species Homo sapiens

Identifiers
- Aliases: ZFPM2, DIH3, FOG2, ZC2HC11B, ZNF89B, hFOG-2, SRXY9, zinc finger protein, FOG family member 2
- External IDs: OMIM: 603693; MGI: 1334444; GeneCards: ZFPM2

Gene location (Human)
Chr.	Chromosome 8 (human)
Band	8q23.1	Start	104,590,733 bp
Band	8q23.1	End	105,804,539 bp

Gene location (Mouse)
Chr.	Chromosome 15 (mouse)
Band	15 B3.1|15 15.74 cM	Start	40,518,431 bp
Band	15 B3.1|15 15.74 cM	End	40,967,988 bp
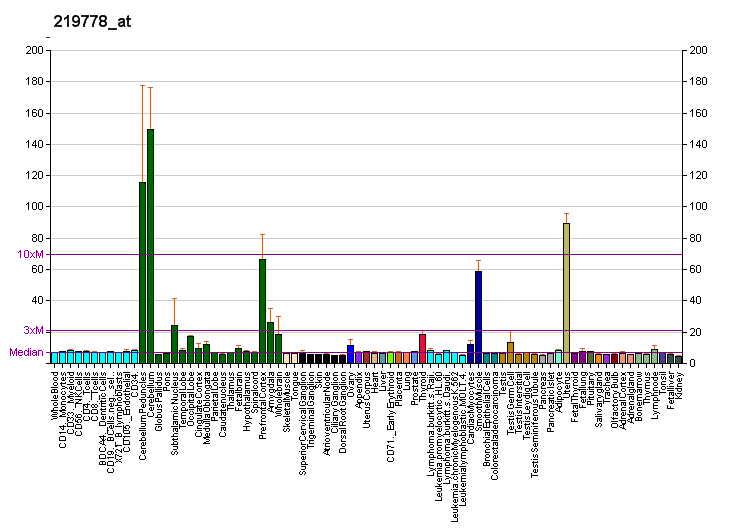
RNA expression pattern
Bgee	Human / Mouse (ortholog); Top expressed in: Skeletal muscle tissue of biceps brachii; germinal epithelium; cartilage tissue; vastus lateralis muscle; glutes; cardiac muscle tissue of right atrium; triceps brachii muscle; pons; parietal pleura; myocardium of left ventricle / Top expressed in: atrioventricular valve; efferent ductule; endocardial cushion; lobe of cerebellum; cerebellar vermis; vas deferens; Gonadal ridge; lumbar subsegment of spinal cord; umbilical cord; pontine nuclei; More reference expression data
BioGPS	More reference expression data
Gene ontology
Molecular function	DNA binding; transcription coactivator activity; transcription corepressor activity; zinc ion binding; transcription factor binding; metal ion binding; DNA-binding transcription repressor activity, RNA polymerase II-specific; protein binding; nucleic acid binding; DNA-binding transcription factor activity, RNA polymerase II-specific
Cellular component	cytoplasm; nucleoplasm; nucleus
Biological process	negative regulation of fat cell differentiation; regulation of transcription, DNA-templated; embryonic organ development; lung development; cardiac muscle tissue development; ventricular septum morphogenesis; right ventricular cardiac muscle tissue morphogenesis; blood coagulation; in utero embryonic development; negative regulation of transcription by RNA polymerase II; negative regulation of cell death; transcription, DNA-templated; outflow tract septum morphogenesis; vasculogenesis; positive regulation of transcription, DNA-templated; development of the heart; negative regulation of female gonad development; gonadal mesoderm development; negative regulation of transcription, DNA-templated; positive regulation of male gonad development; positive regulation of transcription by RNA polymerase II; positive regulation of cardiac muscle cell proliferation; cell differentiation; transcription by RNA polymerase II; regulation of transcription by RNA polymerase II
Sources:Amigo / QuickGO
Orthologs
Databases	NCBI: entry; OMA: entry
Species	Human	Mouse
Entrez	23414	22762
Ensembl	ENSG00000169946	ENSMUSG00000022306
UniProt	Q8WW38	Q8CCH7
RefSeq (mRNA)	NM_012082; NM_001362836; NM_001362837	NM_011766; NM_001356998
RefSeq (protein)	NP_036214; NP_001349765; NP_001349766	NP_035896; NP_001343927
Location (UCSC)	Chr 8: 104.59 – 105.8 Mb	Chr 15: 40.52 – 40.97 Mb
PubMed search
- Wikidata
View/Edit Human	View/Edit Mouse

Zinc finger protein ZFPM2, i.e. zinc finger protein, FOG family member 2, but also termed Friend of GATA2, Friend of GATA-2, FOG2, or FOG-2, is a protein that in humans is encoded by the ZFPM2 and in mice by the Zfpm2 gene.

The zinc finger-containing protein encoded by this gene is a widely expressed member of the FOG family of regulators of transcription factors. The family consists of the ZFPM1 and ZFPM2 genes in humans and Zfpm1 and Zfpm2 genes in mice. Its members may act as coactivators and/or corepressors to modulate the activity of GATA transcription factors. That is, the ZFPM2 protein appears able to interact directly with and thereby either enhance or repress the ability of GATA transcription factors to stimulate the expression of their target genes; the direction of ZFPM2's actions depends on the contexts of the promoter sections of the various GATA target genes.

The ZFPM2 protein interacts primarily with the GATA4 but also with GATA2, GATA5, and GATA6 transcription factors. ZFPM2 protein's interaction with GATA4 is notable for controlling the embryonic development of various tissues, particularly the heart, diaphragm, and gonads. Correspondingly, ZFPM2 mutations are responsible for certain forms of congenital heart defects, congenital diaphragmatic hernias, and ambiguous genitalia in mice as well as humans.

== Gene ==
The ZFPM2 gene is found in a wide range of animal species from flies to humans. The human gene is located on the long or "q" arm of chromosome 8 at position 23.1 (i.e. 8q23.1) and consists of 9 exons. The equivalent mouse gene, Zfpm2, is located on chromosome 15 and consists of 8 exons. Knockout of ZFPM2 is embryonic lethal in mice, with mice dying at embryonic day 12.5–15.5 due to congenital cardiac defects (thin heart ventricular muscle, common atrioventricular canal, and the tetralogy of Fallot malformation. ZFPM2 expression in mice is also required for normal development of the gonads, lung and diaphragm.

== Protein ==
Both the human and mouse ZFPM2 proteins consists of 1151 amino acids and are expressed in various tissues. The human protein is expressed at relatively high levels in the adult ovary and uterine endometrium while the mouse protein is expressed at relatively high levels in the central nervous system cerebellum and, during the early stages of its development, the heart. Human ZFPM2 contains 8 zinc finger structural motifs and interacts directly with various members of the GATA transcription factor family to modify their ability to stimulate the expression of their target genes. For example, it has been shown to bind directly with the N-terminal zinc finger of the GATA4 transcription factor to inhibit its ability to stimulate the expression of a target gene in an in vitro model system.

The extreme N terminal end of the ZFPM2 protein contains two domains, one of which interacts directly with the Mi-2/NuRD complex (i.e. nucleosome remodeling and histone deacetylase complex or NuRD complex) and other of which binds CTBP1 or CTBP2 proteins. The NuRD complex and the CtBPs are classified as corepressors. that act to promote the ability of ZFPM2 to inhibit the ability of GATA proteins to stimulate the expression of their target genes.

== Pathophysiology ==
ZFPM2 regulates the expression of certain GATA target genes by up-regulating or down-regulating the ability of the GATA transcription factors, primarily GATA3, GATA4, GATA5, and GATA6, to stimulate the expression of their target genes. Interactions with the NuRD complex or a CTBP can cause ZFPM2 to inhibit the ability of GATA3-6 proteins to stimulate the expression of their target genes.

== Clinical relevancy ==
=== Congenital heart disease ===
Mutations in the ZFPM2 gene are responsible for rare and sporadic cases of congenital heart disease. These include cases of Tetralogy of Fallot, truncus arteriosus, failure to form the pulmonary artery valve combined with ventricular septal defect, double outlet right ventricle, transposition of the great arteries, and interrupted aortic arch. Sporadic cases of Tetralogy of Fallot were also found in cases where the levels of Hypermethylation at CpG sites in the ZFPM2 gene promoter were greatly elevated; these cases were associated with decreases cardiac tissue levels of mRNA for ZFPM2. These cases likely reflect the role of ZFPM2 in promoting GATA4's function in the embryonic development of the heart.

=== Congenital diaphragmatic hernia ===
ZFPM2 heterozygous gene mutations are responsible for sporadic cases of congenital diaphragmatic hernias. This development disorder may be the underlying cause for the development of congenital lung dysplasia and pulmonary vascular disorder that leads to pulmonary hypertension. These defects are considered due to haploinsufficiency in ZFPM2 protein and consequential failure of GATA4 to promote normal lung development.

=== Sex development ===
Heterozygous mutations in the ZFPM2 gene are responsible for sporadic, very rare cases of a familial form of disorders of sex development, ambiguous genitalia. The disorder likely reflects haploinsufficiency of the ZFPM2 protein and consequential reduced regulation of GATA4 in promoting normal development of the gonads.
