= GATA3 =

Protein-coding gene in the species Homo sapiens

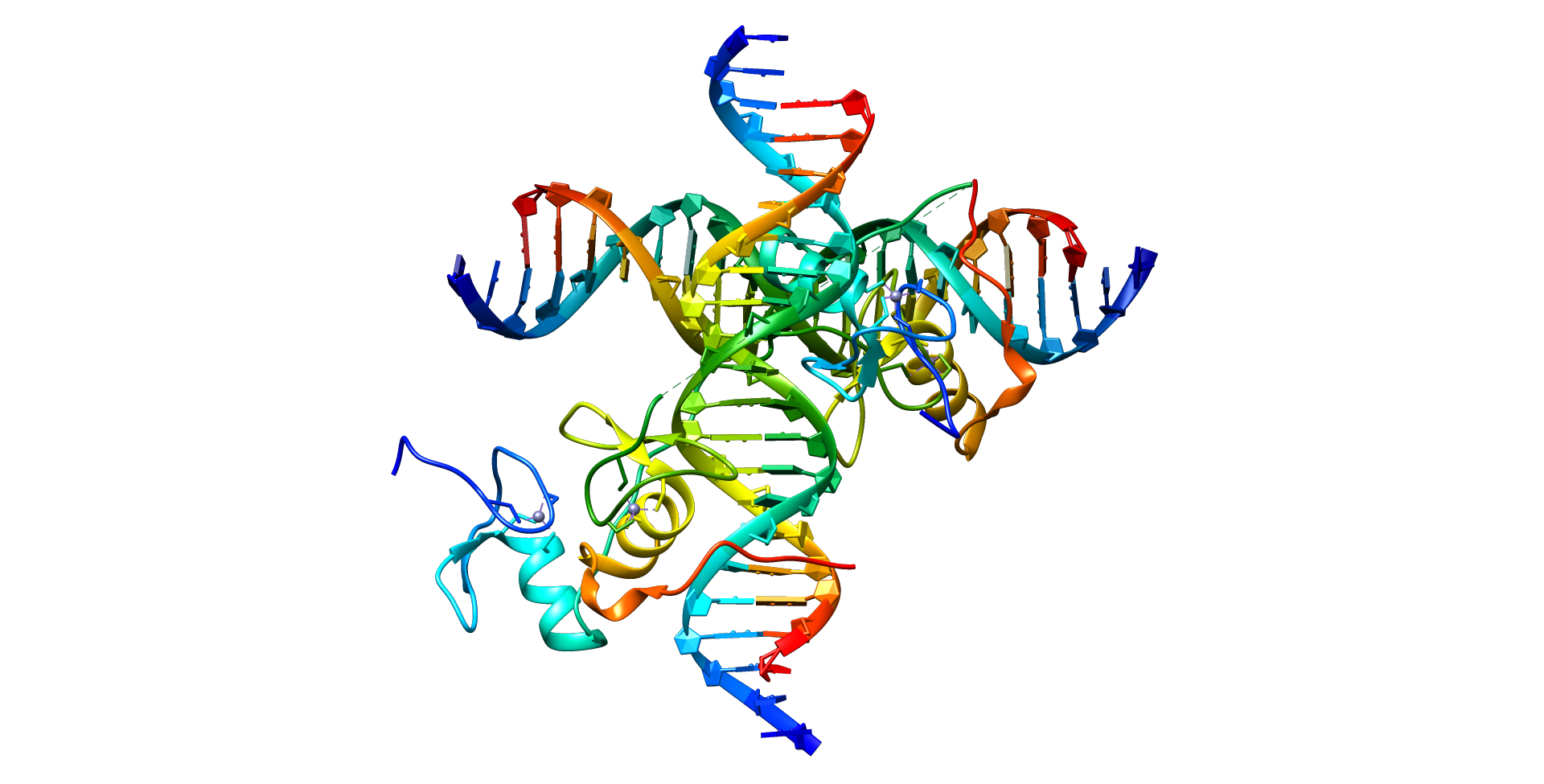

Identifiers
- Aliases: GATA3, HDR, HDRS, GATA binding protein 3
- External IDs: OMIM: 131320; MGI: 95663; GeneCards: GATA3
Available structures
PDB	Ortholog search: PDBe RCSB
PDB	List of PDB id codes 4HC7, 4HC9, 4HCA

Gene location (Human)
Chr.	Chromosome 10 (human)
Band	10p14	Start	8,045,378 bp
Band	10p14	End	8,075,198 bp

Gene location (Mouse)
Chr.	Chromosome 2 (mouse)
Band	2 A1|2 6.69 cM	Start	9,861,889 bp
Band	2 A1|2 6.69 cM	End	9,894,845 bp
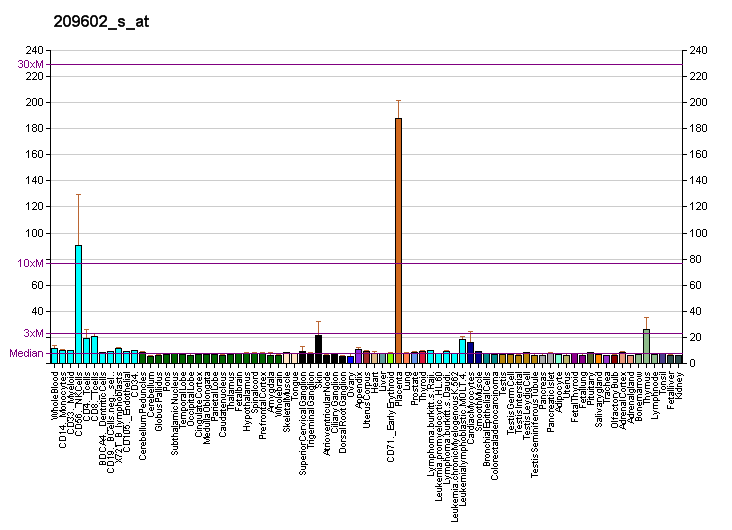

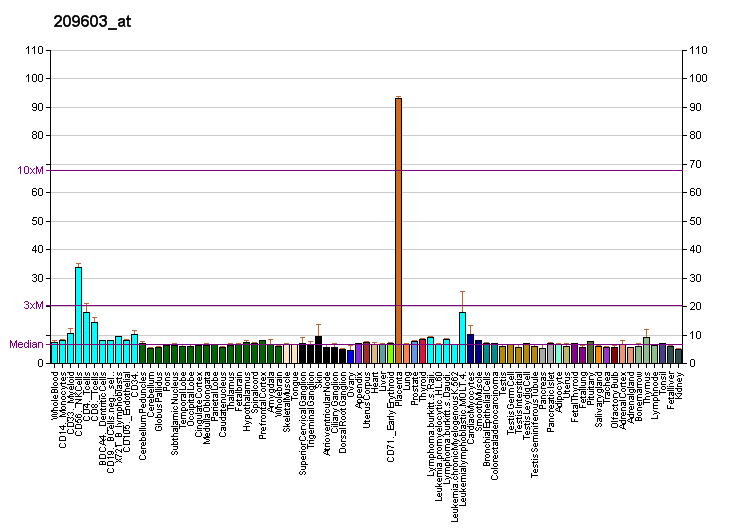

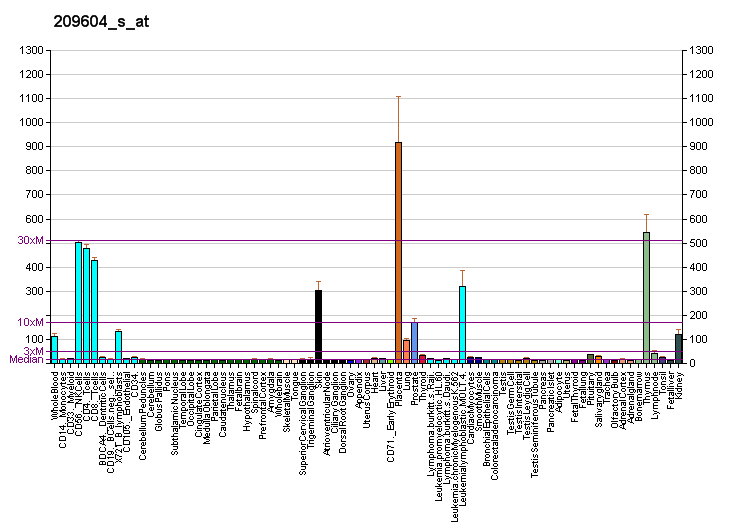
RNA expression pattern
Bgee	Human / Mouse (ortholog); Top expressed in: skin of thigh; skin of hip; nipple; skin of arm; lactiferous duct; renal medulla; seminal vesicula; skin of abdomen; vulva; corpus epididymis / Top expressed in: transitional epithelium of urinary bladder; hair follicle; medullary collecting duct; seminal vesicula; adrenal medulla; lactiferous gland; skin of back; nasal cavity; skin of external ear; lip; More reference expression data
BioGPS	More reference expression data
Gene ontology
Molecular function	RNA polymerase II transcription regulatory region sequence-specific DNA binding; HMG box domain binding; chromatin binding; metal ion binding; DNA binding; cis-regulatory region sequence-specific DNA binding; sequence-specific DNA binding; DNA-binding transcription activator activity, RNA polymerase II-specific; DNA-binding transcription repressor activity, RNA polymerase II-specific; interleukin-2 receptor binding; core promoter sequence-specific DNA binding; transcription cis-regulatory region binding; protein dimerization activity; E-box binding; protein binding; zinc ion binding; transcription factor binding; transcription coactivator activity; RNA polymerase II cis-regulatory region sequence-specific DNA binding; DNA-binding transcription factor activity; DNA-binding transcription factor activity, RNA polymerase II-specific; transcription coregulator activity
Cellular component	nucleus; transcription regulator complex; nucleoplasm
Biological process	negative regulation of cell population proliferation; regulation of establishment of cell polarity; ureteric bud formation; negative regulation of cell cycle; thymic T cell selection; response to ethanol; positive regulation of T cell differentiation; erythrocyte differentiation; inner ear morphogenesis; cell maturation; regulation of histone H3-K27 methylation; cardiac right ventricle morphogenesis; phosphatidylinositol 3-kinase signaling; norepinephrine biosynthetic process; ear development; homeostasis of number of cells; sympathetic nervous system development; T-helper 2 cell differentiation; regulation of cellular response to X-ray; cell fate determination; post-embryonic development; cellular response to BMP stimulus; mesonephros development; neuron differentiation; regulation of neuron apoptotic process; signal transduction; cellular response to cytokine stimulus; cellular response to interleukin-4; T cell receptor signaling pathway; neuron migration; positive regulation of interleukin-5 production; regulation of CD4-positive, alpha-beta T cell differentiation; parathyroid gland development; negative regulation of DNA demethylation; positive regulation of interleukin-4 production; negative regulation of mammary gland epithelial cell proliferation; regulation of transcription by RNA polymerase II; thymus development; nervous system development; otic vesicle development; regulation of transcription, DNA-templated; positive regulation of T-helper 2 cell cytokine production; regulation of nephron tubule epithelial cell differentiation; positive regulation of thyroid hormone generation; lymphocyte migration; negative regulation of interleukin-2 production; regulation of neuron projection development; uterus development; axon guidance; mesenchymal to epithelial transition; negative regulation of cell proliferation involved in mesonephros development; aortic valve morphogenesis; cellular response to tumor necrosis factor; negative regulation of fat cell differentiation; anatomical structure morphogenesis; cellular response to interferon-alpha; negative regulation of transcription, DNA-templated; T cell differentiation; response to virus; negative regulation of endothelial cell apoptotic process; innate immune response; canonical Wnt signaling pathway involved in metanephric kidney development; positive regulation of transcription regulatory region DNA binding; positive regulation of endothelial cell migration; positive regulation of interleukin-13 production; in utero embryonic development; negative regulation of interferon-gamma production; humoral immune response; developmental growth; kidney development; positive regulation of ureteric bud formation; positive regulation of gene expression; mast cell differentiation; positive regulation of histone H3-K9 acetylation; positive regulation of cell differentiation; negative regulation of transcription by RNA polymerase II; male gonad development; nephric duct morphogenesis; ventricular septum development; positive regulation of cytokine production; lens development in camera-type eye; negative regulation of fibroblast growth factor receptor signaling pathway involved in ureteric bud formation; transcription, DNA-templated; negative regulation of gene expression; parathyroid hormone secretion; nephric duct formation; immune system process; negative regulation of inflammatory response; pharyngeal system development; embryonic organ development; response to estrogen; blood coagulation; negative regulation of glial cell-derived neurotrophic factor receptor signaling pathway involved in ureteric bud formation; positive regulation of signal transduction; ureter maturation; positive regulation of histone H3-K14 acetylation; positive regulation of transcription, DNA-templated; response to gamma radiation; cell morphogenesis; embryonic hemopoiesis; positive regulation of transcription by RNA polymerase II; negative regulation of cell motility; pro-T cell differentiation; TOR signaling; type IV hypersensitivity; defense response; regulation of histone H3-K4 methylation; renal system development; positive regulation of protein kinase B signaling; cell activation; chromatin remodeling; T cell differentiation in thymus; cochlea development; transcription by RNA polymerase II; protein deubiquitination; anatomical structure formation involved in morphogenesis; regulation of hematopoietic stem cell differentiation; cytokine-mediated signaling pathway; development of the heart; animal organ morphogenesis; tissue development; cell development; digestive tract development; immune system development; regulation of epithelial cell differentiation; ureter morphogenesis
Sources:Amigo / QuickGO
Orthologs
Databases	NCBI: entry; OMA: entry
Species	Human	Mouse
Entrez	2625	14462
Ensembl	ENSG00000107485	ENSMUSG00000015619
UniProt	P23771	P23772
RefSeq (mRNA)	NM_001002295; NM_002051	NM_008091; NM_001355110; NM_001355111; NM_001355112
RefSeq (protein)	NP_001002295; NP_002042	NP_032117; NP_001342039; NP_001342040; NP_001342041
Location (UCSC)	Chr 10: 8.05 – 8.08 Mb	Chr 2: 9.86 – 9.89 Mb
PubMed search
- Wikidata
View/Edit Human	View/Edit Mouse

GATA3 is a transcription factor that in humans is encoded by the GATA3 gene. Studies in animal models and humans indicate that it controls the expression of a wide range of biologically and clinically important genes.

The GATA3 transcription factor is critical for the embryonic development of various tissues as well as for inflammatory and humoral immune responses and the proper functioning of the endothelium of blood vessels. The GATA factors, GATA1 to GATA6 are a family of zinc finger transcription factors that bind to a consensus DNA sequence (A/T)-G-A-T-A-(A/G) in gene promoters and enhancers. GATA3 plays central role in allergy and immunity against worm infections. GATA3 haploinsufficiency (i.e. loss of one or the two inherited GATA3 genes) results in a congenital disorder termed the Barakat syndrome.

Current clinical and laboratory research is focusing on determining the benefits of directly or indirectly blocking the action of GATA3 in inflammatory and allergic diseases such as asthma. It is also proposed to be a clinically important marker for various types of cancer, particularly those of the breast. However, the role, if any, of GATA3 in the development of these cancers is under study and remains unclear.

== Gene ==
The GATA3 gene is located close to the end of the short arm of chromosome 10 at position p14. It consists of 8 exons, and codes for two variants viz., GATA3, variant 1, and GATA3, variant 2. Expression of GATA3 may be regulated in part or at times by the antisense RNA, GATA3-AS1, whose gene is located close to the GATA3 gene on the short arm of chromosome 10 at position p14. Various types of mutations including point mutations as well as small- and large-scale deletional mutations cause an autosomal dominant genetic disorder, the Barakat syndrome (also termed hypoparathyroidism, deafness, and renal dysplasia syndrome). The location of GATA3 borders that of other critical sites on chromosome 10, particularly a site located at 10p14-p13. Mutations in this site cause the congenital disorder DiGeorge syndrome/velocardiofacial syndrome complex 2 (or DiGeorge syndrome 2). Large-scale deletions in GATA3 may span into the DiGeorge syndrome 2 area and thereby cause a complex syndrome with features of the Barakat syndrome combined with some of those of the DiGeorge syndrome 2. Knockout of both GATA3 genes in mice is fatal: these animals die at embryonic days 11 and 12 due to internal bleeding. They also exhibit gross deformities in the brain and spine as well as aberrations in fetal liver hematopoiesis.

== Protein ==
GATA3 variant 1 is a linear protein consisting of 444 amino acids. GATA3 variant 2 protein is an identically structured isoform of, but 1 amino acid shorter than, GATA3 variant 1. Differences, if any, in the functions of these two variants have not been reported. With respect to the best studied variant, variant 1, but presumably also variant 2, one of the zinc finger structural motifs, ZNF2, is located at the protein's C-terminus and binds to specific gene promoter DNA sequences to regulate the expression of the genes controlled by these promoters. The other zinc finger, ZNF1, is at the protein's N-terminus and interacts with various nuclear factors, including Zinc finger protein 1 (i.e. ZFPM1, also termed Friends of GATA1 [i.e. FOG-1]) and ZFPM2 (i.e. FOG-2), that modulate GATA3's gene-stimulating actions.

== Pathophysiology ==
The GATA3 transcription factor regulates the expression of genes involved in the development of various tissues as well as genes involved in physiological as well as pathological humoral inflammatory and allergic responses.

== Function ==
GATA3 belongs to the GATA family of transcription factors. Gene-deletion studies in mice indicate that Gata3 (mouse gene equivalent to GATA3) is critical for the embryonic development and/or function of various cell types (e.g. fat cells, neural crest cells, lymphocytes) and tissues (e.g. kidney, liver, brain, spinal cord, mammary gland). Studies in humans implicate GATA3 in the following:

- 1) GATA3 is required for the development of the parathyroid gland, sensory components of the auditory system, and the kidney in animals and humans. It may also contribute to the development of the vagina and uterus in humans.
- 2) In humans, GATA3 is required for the development and/or function of innate lymphoid cells (ILCs), particularly Group 2 ILCs as well as for the development of T helper cells,(Th cells), particularly Th2 cells. Group 2 ILCs and Th2 cells, and thereby GATA3, are critical for the development of allergic and humoral immune responses in humans. Comparable studies in animals implicate GATA3 in the development of lymphocytes that mediate allergic and humoral immunity as well as allergic and humoral immune responses.
- 3) GATA3 promotes the secretion of IL-4, IL-5, and IL-13 from Th2 cells in humans and has similar actions on comparable mouse lymphocytes. All three of these interleukins serve to promote allergic responses,
- 4) GATA3 induces the maturation of precursor cells into breast epithelial cells and maintains these cells in their mature state in mice and possibly humans.
- 5) In mice, GATA3 is responsible for the normal development of various tissues including the skin, fat cells, the thymus, and the nervous system.

== Clinical significance ==
=== Mutations ===
Inactivating mutations in one of the two parental GATA3 genes cause the congenital disorder of hypoparathyroidism with sensorineural deafness and kidney malformations, i.e. the Barakat syndrome. This rare syndrome may occur in families or as a new mutation in an individual from a family with no history of the disorder. Mutations in GATA3 cause variable degrees of hypoparathyroidism, deafness, and kidney disease birth defects because of 1) individual differences in the penetrance of the mutation, 2) a sporadic, and as yet unexplained, association with malformation of uterus and vagina, and 3) mutations which extend beyond the GATA3 gene into chromosomal areas where mutations are responsible for developing other types of abnormalities which are characteristics of the DeGeorge syndrome 2. The Barakat syndrome is due to a haploinsufficiency in GATA3 levels, i.e. levels of the transcription factor that are insufficient for the normal development of the cited tissues during embryogenesis.

=== Allergy ===
Mouse studies indicate that inhibiting the expression of GATA3 using antisense RNA methods suppresses allergic inflammation. The protein is overexpressed in the afflicted tissues of individuals with various forms of allergy including asthma, rhinitis, nasal polyps, and atopic eczema. This suggests that it may have a role in promoting these disorders. In a phase IIA clinical study of individuals suffering allergen-induced asthma, inhalation of Deoxyribozyme ST010, which specifically inactivates GATA3 messenger RNA, for 28 days reduced early and late immune lung responses to inhaled allergen. The clinical benefit of inhibiting GATA3 in this disorder is thought to be due to interfering with the function of Group 2 ILCs and Th2 cells by, for example, reducing their production of IL-4, IL-13, and especially IL-5. Reduction in these eosinophil-stimulating interleukins, it is postulated, reduces this cells ability to promote allergic reactivity and responses. For similar reasons, this treatment might also prove to be clinical useful for treating other allergic disorders.

=== Tumors ===
==== Breast tumors ====
===== Development =====
GATA3 is one of the three genes mutated in >10% of breast cancers (Cancer Genome Atlas). Studies in mice indicate that the gene is critical for the normal development of breast tissue and directly regulates luminal cell (i.e. cells lining mammary ducts) differentiation in experimentally induced breast cancer. Analytic studies of human breast cancer tissues suggest that GATA3 is required for specific type of low risk breast cancer (i.e. luminal A), is integral to the expression of estrogen receptor alpha, and (in estrogen receptor negative/androgen receptor positive cancers) androgen receptor signaling. These studies suggest that GATA3 is involved in the development of at least certain types of breast cancer in humans. However, there is disagreement on this, with some studies suggesting that the expression of the GATA3 acts to inhibit and other studies suggesting that it acts to promote the development, growth, and/or spread of this cancer. Further studies are needed to elucidate the role, if any, of GATA3 in the development of breast cancer.

===== Marker =====
Immuocytochemical analysis of GATA3 protein in breast cells is a valuable marker for diagnosing primary breast cancer, being tested as positive in up to 94% of cases. It is especially valuable for estrogen receptor positive breast cancers but is less sensitive (435-66% elevated), although still more valuable than many other markers, for diagnosing triple-negative breast cancers. This analysis is widely used as a clinically valuable marker for breast cancer.

==== Other tumor types ====
Similar to breast tumors, the role of GATA3 in the genesis of other tumor types is unclear but detection of its transcription factor product may be diagnostically useful. Immuocytochemical analysis of GATA3 protein is considered a valuable marker for certain types of urinary bladder and urethral cancers as well as for parathyroid gland tumors (cancerous or benign), Single series reports suggest that this analysis might also be of value for diagnosing salivary gland tumors, salivary duct carcinomas, mammary analog secretory carcinomas, benign ovarian Brenner tumors, benign Walthard cell rests, and paragangliomas.

== Interactions ==
GATA3 has been shown to interact with the following transcription factor regulators: ZFPM1 and ZFPM2; LMO1; and FOXA1. These regulators may promote or inhibit GATA3 in stimulating the expression of its target genes.

== See also ==
- GATA transcription factors
