= Zinc finger protein ZFPM1 =

Protein found in humans

ZFPM1
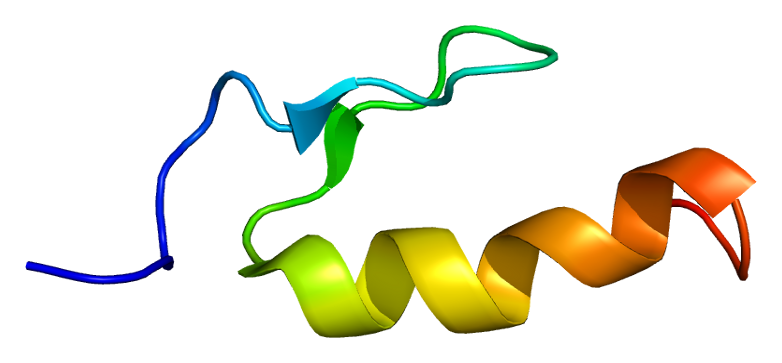

Identifiers
- Aliases: ZFPM1, FOG, FOG1, ZC2HC11A, ZNF408, ZNF89A, zinc finger protein, FOG family member 1
- External IDs: OMIM: 601950; MGI: 1095400; GeneCards: ZFPM1
Available structures
PDB	Ortholog search: PDBe RCSB
PDB	List of PDB id codes 2XU7

Gene location (Human)
Chr.	Chromosome 16 (human)
Band	16q24.2	Start	88,453,280 bp
Band	16q24.2	End	88,537,031 bp

Gene location (Mouse)
Chr.	Chromosome 8 (mouse)
Band	8|8 E1	Start	123,008,880 bp
Band	8|8 E1	End	123,063,990 bp
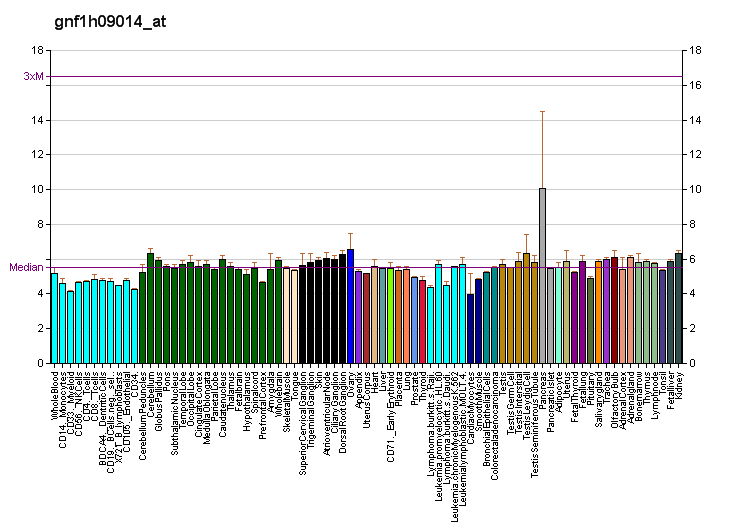
RNA expression pattern
Bgee	Human / Mouse (ortholog); Top expressed in: pancreatic ductal cell; mucosa of ileum; nasal epithelium; pylorus; cardia; parotid gland; ventral tegmental area; subthalamic nucleus; external globus pallidus; vena cava / Top expressed in: tibiofemoral joint; fetal liver hematopoietic progenitor cell; left lobe of liver; epithelium of stomach; pyloric antrum; internal carotid artery; external carotid artery; spleen; duodenum; human fetus; More reference expression data
BioGPS	More reference expression data
Gene ontology
Molecular function	DNA binding; transcription factor binding; metal ion binding; DNA-binding transcription repressor activity, RNA polymerase II-specific; protein binding; nucleic acid binding; RNA polymerase II cis-regulatory region sequence-specific DNA binding; DNA-binding transcription factor activity, RNA polymerase II-specific
Cellular component	cytoplasm; transcription regulator complex; transcription repressor complex; nucleoplasm; nucleus
Biological process	megakaryocyte development; megakaryocyte differentiation; negative regulation of mast cell differentiation; negative regulation of fat cell differentiation; regulation of transcription, DNA-templated; homeostasis of number of cells; ventricular septum morphogenesis; outflow tract morphogenesis; platelet formation; blood coagulation; cardiac muscle tissue morphogenesis; negative regulation of transcription by RNA polymerase II; negative regulation of protein binding; transcription, DNA-templated; regulation of chemokine production; atrial septum morphogenesis; development of the heart; atrioventricular valve morphogenesis; granulocyte differentiation; embryonic hemopoiesis; regulation of definitive erythrocyte differentiation; T-helper cell lineage commitment; primitive erythrocyte differentiation; mitral valve formation; tricuspid valve formation; definitive erythrocyte differentiation; positive regulation of transcription by RNA polymerase II; erythrocyte differentiation; regulation of megakaryocyte differentiation; regulation of transcription by RNA polymerase II
Sources:Amigo / QuickGO
Orthologs
Databases	NCBI: entry; OMA: entry
Species	Human	Mouse
Entrez	161882	22761
Ensembl	ENSG00000179588	ENSMUSG00000049577
UniProt	Q8IX07	O35615
RefSeq (mRNA)	NM_153813	NM_009569
RefSeq (protein)	NP_722520	NP_033595
Location (UCSC)	Chr 16: 88.45 – 88.54 Mb	Chr 8: 123.01 – 123.06 Mb
PubMed search
- Wikidata
View/Edit Human	View/Edit Mouse

Zinc finger protein ZFPM1 also known as friend of GATA protein 1 (FOG-1) is a protein that in humans is encoded by the ZFPM1 gene. It is a cofactor of the GATA1, GATA2, and possibly GATA3 transcription factors.

== Friends of GATA family ==
Friends of GATA (FOG) proteins are a family of proteins that act as specific coactivators for GATA transcription factors. In mammals, this family consists of ZFPM1 (FOG-1) and ZFPM2 (FOG-2), which bind to GATA factors and either inhibit or promote activity.
