= Amin J. Barakat =

American Lebanese physician

Amin J. Barakat (Arabic: أمين بركات; born November 2, 1942) is a Lebanese-American physician known for the description of Barakat syndrome.

Barakat was in full-time pediatric practice at Northern Virginia Pediatric Associates before retiring in 2020. He is certified by the American Board of Pediatrics. He is also clinical professor of pediatrics and pediatric nephrology at Georgetown University. Barakat is a member of the ALSAC/St Jude Children's Research Hospital Leadership Council, and president of the American Foundation for Saint George Hospital.

== Early and personal life ==
Barakat was born in Mounsef, Byblos, Lebanon, and attended Tripoli Boys School in Tripoli and International College, Beirut. He received his college and medical education at the American University of Beirut (AUB). From 1967 to 1970, he completed pediatric residencies at AUB and Johns Hopkins Hospital in Baltimore, and then obtained fellowship training in pediatric nephrology at Georgetown University from 1970 to 1972. Barakat has held academic teaching positions at AUB, Vanderbilt and Georgetown universities.

Barakat is married to Amal Nassar and has three children. He lives in Vienna, Virginia.

== Research ==
Barakat's focus in research has been with children with rare hereditary and congenital kidney disease.

=== Barakat syndrome ===
In 1977, Barakat and co-authors J.B. D'Albora, M.M. Martin, and P.A. Jose described four siblings with familial nephrosis, nerve deafness, and hypoparathyroidism. This syndrome is now known as Barakat syndrome.

Barakat syndrome is an inherited condition characterized by hypoparathyroidism, sensorineural hearing loss, and renal (kidney) disease. Most cases have been attributed to a mutation on chromosome 10p which affects the GATA3 gene. Inheritance is likely autosomal dominant. Treatment is symptomatic and supportive.

== Publications ==
=== Books ===
- Barakat, Amin Y; et al. (1986). The Kidney in Genetic Disease. Edinburgh: Churchill Livingstone. ISBN 0-443-02104-X.
- Barakat, Amin Y. (1990). Renal Disease in Children: Clinical Evaluation and Diagnosis. Berlin: Springer-Verlag. ISBN 0-387-97036-3.
- Amin J. Barakat and Russell W. Chesney, ed. (2009). Pediatric Nephrology for Primary Care. Amer Academy of Pediatrics. ISBN 978-1-58110-297-0.
- Amin J Barakat and H. Gil Rushton, editors. Congenital Anomalies of the Kidney and Urinary Tract: Clinical Implications in Children. Switzerland, Springer, 2016. ISBN 978-3-319-29217-5
- In 2007, Barakat edited the Arabic edition of the American Academy of Pediatrics's Caring For Your Baby and Young Child: Birth to Age 5, Beirut, AllPrints. ISBN 9953-88-002-6

=== Articles ===
- "Pseudohermaphroditism, Nephron Disorder and Wilms' Tumor: A Unifying Concept", Pediatrics 54: 366, 1974.
- "Urogenital Abnormalities in Genetic Disease", Journal of Urology 136: 778, 1986. doi:10.1016/S0022-5347(17)45078-6
- "Hypokalemic Alkalosis, Hyperreninemia, Aldosteronism, Normal Blood Pressure and Normal Juxtaglomerular Apparatus : A New Syndrome of Renal Alkalosis", International Journal of Pediatric Nephrology 7: 99, 1986.
- "Renal and Urinary Tract Abnormalities Associated with Chromosome Aberrations", International Journal of Pediatric Nephrology 8: 215, 1987.
- "Townes-Brocks Syndrome: Report of Three Additional Patients with Previously Undescribed Renal and Cardiac Abnormalities", Dysmorphology and Clinical Genetics 2: 104, 1988.
- "Antenatal Diagnosis of Renal Abnormalities: A Review of the State of the Art", Journal of the Southern Medical Association 82: 229, 1989.
- "The Association of Congenital Abnormalities of the Kidney and Urinary Tract with Those of Other Organ Systems in 13,775 Autopsies", Child Nephrology and Urology 9: 269, 1989.
- "An Infant with Deletion of the Distal Long Arm of Chromosome 15 (q26.1----qter) and Loss of Insulin-like Growth Factor 1 Receptor Gene", American Journal of Medical Genetics, May 1991.
- "Reliability of Ultrasound in the Prenatal Diagnosis of Urinary Tract Abnormalities", Pediatric Nephrology (Berlin, Germany), June 1991.
- "Occurrence of Congenital Abnormalities of Kidney and Urinary Tract in 13,775 Autopsies", Urology, Jan. 1992.
- "Kidney Abnormalities in Hajdu-Cheney Syndrome", Pediatric Nephrology (Berlin, Germany), March 1997.
- "Kidney Disease: Jade, Dialysis or Transplantation?" (editorial), Le Journal Médical Libanais (The Lebanese Medical Journal), Sept. 1997.
- "Renal Disease in Lebanese Children and Adolescents: Findings in 118 Consecutive Percutaneous Renal Biopsies", Le Journal Médical Libanais (The Lebanese Medical Journal), June 1999.
- "Gitelman's Syndrome (Familial Hypokalemia-Hypomagnesemia)", Journal of Nephrology, June 2001.
- "22q13 Deletion Syndrome with Central Diabetes Insipidus: a Previously Unreported Association" - Clinical Dysmorphology, Jan. 2005.
- "Hereditary Angioedema in Children", Angioedema 1:15, 2010.
- "Presentation of the Child with Renal Disease and Guidelines for Referral to the Pediatric Nephrologist" - International Journal of Pediatrics, Volume 2012 (2012).
- Barakat AJ: Presentation of renal disease in children. Pediatr Ann 42: 40, 2013.
- Barakat AJ: Editorial: Pediatric Nephrology. Pediatr Ann 42: 106, 2013.
- Barakat AJ: Editor. Special Issue on Pediatric Nephrology. Pediatr Ann 42, 2013.
- Barakat AJ: Nephrology in the pediatric office. 7th congress of Nephrology in Internet. CIN, 2013.
- Barakat AJ: Prevention of kidney disease in children. 7th congress of Nephrology in Internet. CIN, 2013.
- Barakat AJ: Barakat syndrome. NORD (National Organization of Rare Disorders), 2015.
- Barakat AJ: Editor. Special Issue: Pediatric Nephrology: An Update. The Open Urology
- Nephrology Journal 8, 2015. Special Issue on Pediatric Nephrology
- Barakat AJ: Editorial. Pediatric Nephrology: An Update. The Open Urology & Nephrology Journal 8: 90, 201576.
- Barakat AJ, Raygada M, Rennert OM. Barakat syndrome revisited. Am J Med Genet Part A. 2018; Barakat syndrome revisited
- Barakat AJ. Renal Disease: Clinical Presentation in Children. Ann Pediatr Res. 2021; 5 (1): 1054.
- Barakat AJ, Zalzal H. Characteristics of Hearing Loss in the Barakat Syndrome. Ann Pediatr Res. 2020; 4 (5): 1051.
- Barakat AJ. Association of congenital anomalies of the kidney and urinary tract with those of other organ systems: clinical implications. Nephrol Renal Dis, 2020; 5(4):1-4.
- Barakat AJ, Evans C, Gill M, Nelson D. Rapid strep testing in children with recently treated streptococcal pharyngitis. Pediatr Invest. 2019: 3 (1): 27-30.

== Awards and honors ==
- Alpha Omega Alpha Honor Medical Society
- Ellis Island Medal of Honor
- Best Doctors in America
- Guide to America's Top Pediatricians
- Who's Who in Medicine and Health Care, Who's Who in America, Who's Who in the World
