= Barakat syndrome =

Disease characterized by hypoparathyroidism, sensorineural deafness and renal disease

- Other names: HDR syndrome
- This condition is inherited in an autosomal dominant manner.
- Specialty: Medical genetics

Barakat syndrome is a rare disease characterized by hypoparathyroidism, sensorineural deafness and renal disease, and hence also known as HDR syndrome. It is an autosomal dominant condition with incomplete penetrance and variable expressivity that was first described by Amin J. Barakat et al. in 1977.

== Signs and symptoms ==
It is a genetic developmental disorder with clinical diversity characterized by hypoparathyroidism, sensorineural deafness and renal disease. Sensorineural deafness typically presents in childhood or adolescence. Affected people usually present with hypocalcaemia, tetany, or afebrile convulsions at any age. Hearing loss is usually bilateral and may range from mild to profound impairment. Renal disease includes nephrotic syndrome, cystic kidney, renal dysplasia, hypoplasia or aplasia, pelvicalyceal deformity, vesicoureteral reflux, chronic kidney disease, hematuria, proteinuria and renal scarring.

Other reported features include: intellectual disability, polycystic ovaries, particular distinct facial characteristics, ischaemic stroke and retinitis pigmentosa.

== Genetics ==
Barakat syndrome is a rare condition inherited as autosomal dominant trait.

The defect in the majority of cases has mapped to chromosome 10p (Gene Map Locus: 10pter-p13 or 10p14-p15.1). Haploinsufficiency (deletions) of zinc-finger transcription factor GATA3 or mutations in the GATA3 gene appear to be the underlying cause of this syndrome. It causes the failure in the specification of prosensory domain and subsequently leads to increased cell death in the cochlear duct thus causing deafness.

Since the spectrum of phenotypic variation in affected people is quite large, Barakat syndrome probably arises as a low penetrance haploinsufficient disorder in which their genetic background plays a major role in the severity of the disease.

== Diagnosis ==
A thorough diagnosis should be performed on every affected individual, and siblings should be studied for deafness, parathyroid and renal disease. The syndrome should be considered in infants who have been diagnosed prenatally with a chromosome 10p defect, and those who have been diagnosed with well defined phenotypes of urinary tract abnormalities.

== Treatment ==
Management consists of treating the clinical abnormalities at the time of presentation and includes genetic counselling, correcting calcium, treating hearing problems, monitoring kidney function and close monitoring of cysts of the kidney.

== Prognosis ==
Prognosis depends on the severity of the kidney disease. Life expectancy is unaffected if the disease is mild.

== Epidemiology ==
The frequency is unknown, but the disease is considered to be very rare. Both male and females have been noted to be affected by hypoparathyroidism, sensorineural deafness, and renal disease. However, specific symptoms and severity can vary. Around 65% of people with Barakat syndrome have hypoparathyroidism, sensorineural deafness and kidney disease together. As of 2023, the global medical literature has documented 180 reported cases.
