= Arthrogryposis–renal dysfunction–cholestasis syndrome =

- Other names: ARC syndrome
- Arthrogryposis–renal dysfunction–cholestasis syndrome is inherited in an autosomal recessive manner.
- Specialty: Dermatology

Arthrogryposis–renal dysfunction–cholestasis syndrome is a cutaneous condition caused by a mutation in the VPS33B gene.

== See also ==
- Multiple sulfatase deficiency
- List of cutaneous conditions
