= Urology (journal) =

- Discipline: Urology, nephrology
- Language: English
- Edited by: Hadley Wood

Publication details
- History: 1973–present
- Publisher: Elsevier
- Frequency: Monthly
- Impact factor: 2.649 (2020)

Standard abbreviations
- ISO 4: Urology

Indexing
- CODEN: URGYAZ
- ISSN: 0090-4295
- LCCN: 73641285
- OCLC no.: 1785123

Links
- Journal homepage; Online access

Urology, also known as The Gold Journal, is a monthly peer-reviewed medical journal covering urology and nephrology. It is published by Elsevier on behalf of the Société Internationale d'Urologie and the editor-in-chief is Hadley Wood. It was established in 1973.

== Abstracting and indexing ==
The journal is abstracted and indexed in Current Contents, EMBASE, MEDLINE, and Scopus. According to the Journal Citation Reports, Urology has a 2020 impact factor of 2.649.
