= GATA6 =

Protein-coding gene in the species Homo sapiens

Identifiers
- Aliases: GATA6, GATA binding protein 6
- External IDs: OMIM: 601656; MGI: 107516; GeneCards: GATA6

Gene location (Human)
Chr.	Chromosome 18 (human)
Band	18q11.2	Start	22,169,589 bp
Band	18q11.2	End	22,202,528 bp

Gene location (Mouse)
Chr.	Chromosome 18 (mouse)
Band	18 A1|18 5.63 cM	Start	11,052,064 bp
Band	18 A1|18 5.63 cM	End	11,085,635 bp
RNA expression pattern
Bgee	Human / Mouse (ortholog); Top expressed in: germinal epithelium; parietal pleura; jejunal mucosa; pylorus; right ventricle; cardiac muscle tissue of right atrium; right ovary; left ovary; lower lobe of lung; left adrenal gland / Top expressed in: atrium; atrioventricular valve; epithelium of stomach; endocardial cushion; right ventricle; pyloric antrum; migratory enteric neural crest cell; morula; semi-lunar valve; septum transversum; More reference expression data
BioGPS	n/a
Gene ontology
Molecular function	DNA binding; sequence-specific DNA binding; RNA polymerase II transcription regulatory region sequence-specific DNA binding; DNA-binding transcription activator activity, RNA polymerase II-specific; DNA-binding transcription factor activity; zinc ion binding; transcription factor binding; chromatin binding; metal ion binding; protein binding; transcription factor activity, RNA polymerase II distal enhancer sequence-specific binding; protein kinase binding; RNA polymerase II cis-regulatory region sequence-specific DNA binding; DNA-binding transcription factor activity, RNA polymerase II-specific; cis-regulatory region sequence-specific DNA binding
Cellular component	transcription regulator complex; nucleoplasm; nucleus; nuclear membrane
Biological process	club cell differentiation; male gonad development; regulation of transcription, DNA-templated; epithelial cell differentiation; endodermal cell differentiation; negative regulation of transforming growth factor beta1 production; cardiac muscle tissue development; pancreatic A cell differentiation; cardiac muscle cell differentiation; cardiac vascular smooth muscle cell differentiation; cellular response to BMP stimulus; endodermal cell fate determination; blood coagulation; in utero embryonic development; negative regulation of transcription by RNA polymerase II; transcription by RNA polymerase II; negative regulation of transforming growth factor beta2 production; tube morphogenesis; negative regulation of apoptotic process; smooth muscle cell differentiation; transcription, DNA-templated; positive regulation of angiogenesis; outflow tract septum morphogenesis; response to estrogen; animal organ formation; positive regulation of cardiac muscle cell proliferation; cardiac muscle hypertrophy in response to stress; intestinal epithelial cell differentiation; positive regulation of BMP signaling pathway; positive regulation of cardioblast differentiation; regulation of gene expression; phospholipid metabolic process; liver development; pancreas development; response to growth factor; type II pneumocyte differentiation; lung saccule development; negative regulation of transcription, DNA-templated; cellular response to hypoxia; type B pancreatic cell differentiation; cellular response to gonadotropin stimulus; positive regulation of transcription by RNA polymerase II; positive regulation of transcription, DNA-templated; positive regulation of cardiac muscle myoblast proliferation; development of the heart; animal organ morphogenesis; tissue development; cell development; anatomical structure formation involved in morphogenesis; digestive tract development
Sources:Amigo / QuickGO
Orthologs
Databases	NCBI: entry; OMA: entry
Species	Human	Mouse
Entrez	2627	14465
Ensembl	ENSG00000141448	ENSMUSG00000005836
UniProt	Q92908	Q61169
RefSeq (mRNA)	NM_005257	NM_010258
RefSeq (protein)	NP_005248	NP_034388
Location (UCSC)	Chr 18: 22.17 – 22.2 Mb	Chr 18: 11.05 – 11.09 Mb
PubMed search
- Wikidata
View/Edit Human	View/Edit Mouse

Transcription factor GATA-6, also known as GATA-binding factor 6 (GATA6), is protein that in humans is encoded by the GATA6 gene. The gene product preferentially binds (A/T/C)GAT(A/T)(A) of the consensus binding sequence.

== Clinical significance ==
Mutations in the gene have been linked with pancreatic agenesis and congenital heart defects.

=== Lung Endodermal Epithelial Development ===
GATA-6, a zinc finger transcription factor, is important in the endodermal differentiation of organ tissues. It is also indicated in proper lung development by controlling the late differentiation stages of alveolar epithelium and aquaporin-5 promoter activation. Furthermore, GATA-6 has been linked to the production of LIF, a cytokine that encourages proliferation of endodermal embryonic stem cells and blocks early epiblast differentiation. If left unregulated in the developing embryo, this cytokine production and chemical signal contributes to the phenotypes discussed further below.

Upon the disruption of GATA-6 in an embryo, the distal lung epithelial development is stunted in transgenic mice models The progenitor cells, or stem cells, for alveolar epithelial tissues develop and are specified appropriately, however further differentiation does not occur. Also the distal-proximal bronchiole development is affected, resulting in a reduced quantity of airway exchange sites.

This branching deficit, which will cause bilateral pulmonary hypoplasia after birth, has been locally associated with areas lacking differentiated alveolar epithelium, implicating this phenotype as inherent to endodermal function, and thus may be indirectly linked to improper GATA-6 expression. That is, a deficit of bronchiole branching may not be a result of direct transcriptional error in GATA-6, but rather a side effect of such an error.

== See also ==
- GATA transcription factor
