= Salivary duct carcinoma =

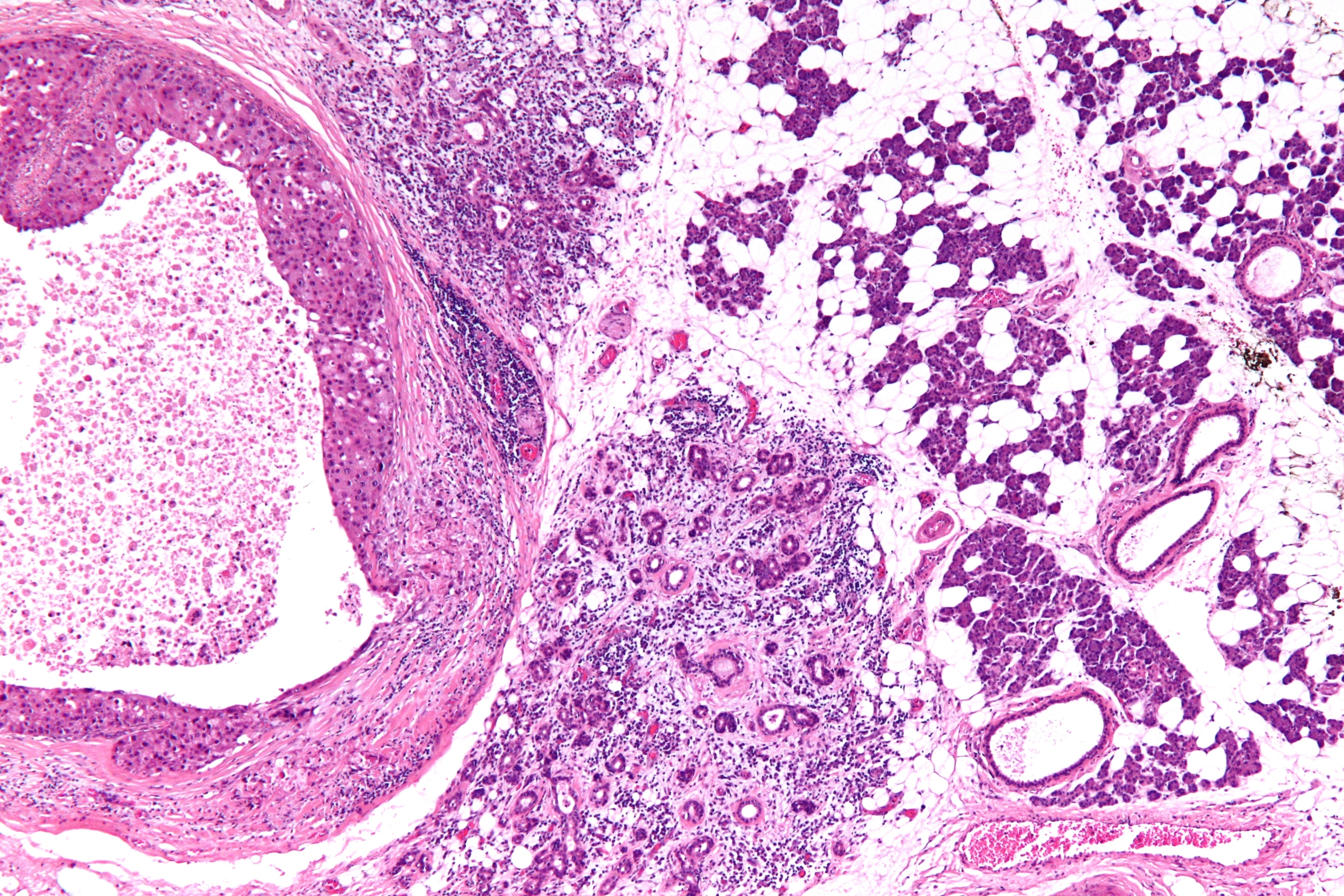
- Low magnification micrograph of a salivary duct carcinoma with characteristic comedonecrosis (left of image) adjacent to normal parotid gland (right of image). H&E stain.
- Specialty: ENT surgery

Salivary duct carcinoma (SDC) is a rare type of aggressive cancer that arises from the salivary glands. It is predominantly seen in men and, generally, has a poor prognosis. Other high grade carcinomas can mimic SDC. About 40-60% of SDC arise in pleomorphic adenomas. Most, if not all, SDCs express androgen receptor by immunohistochemistry. Therapeutically relevant genetic alterations include ERBB2/Her2 amplification, PIK3CA and/or HRAS mutations.

== Signs and symptoms ==
The typical presentation is a rapidly growing mass with associated pain. This may be seen in association with neck lymph node swelling (cervical lymphadenopathy), due to metastases, and facial nerve paralysis.

== Diagnosis ==
SDC are diagnosed by examination of tissue, e.g. a biopsy.

Their histologic appearance is similar to ductal breast carcinoma.

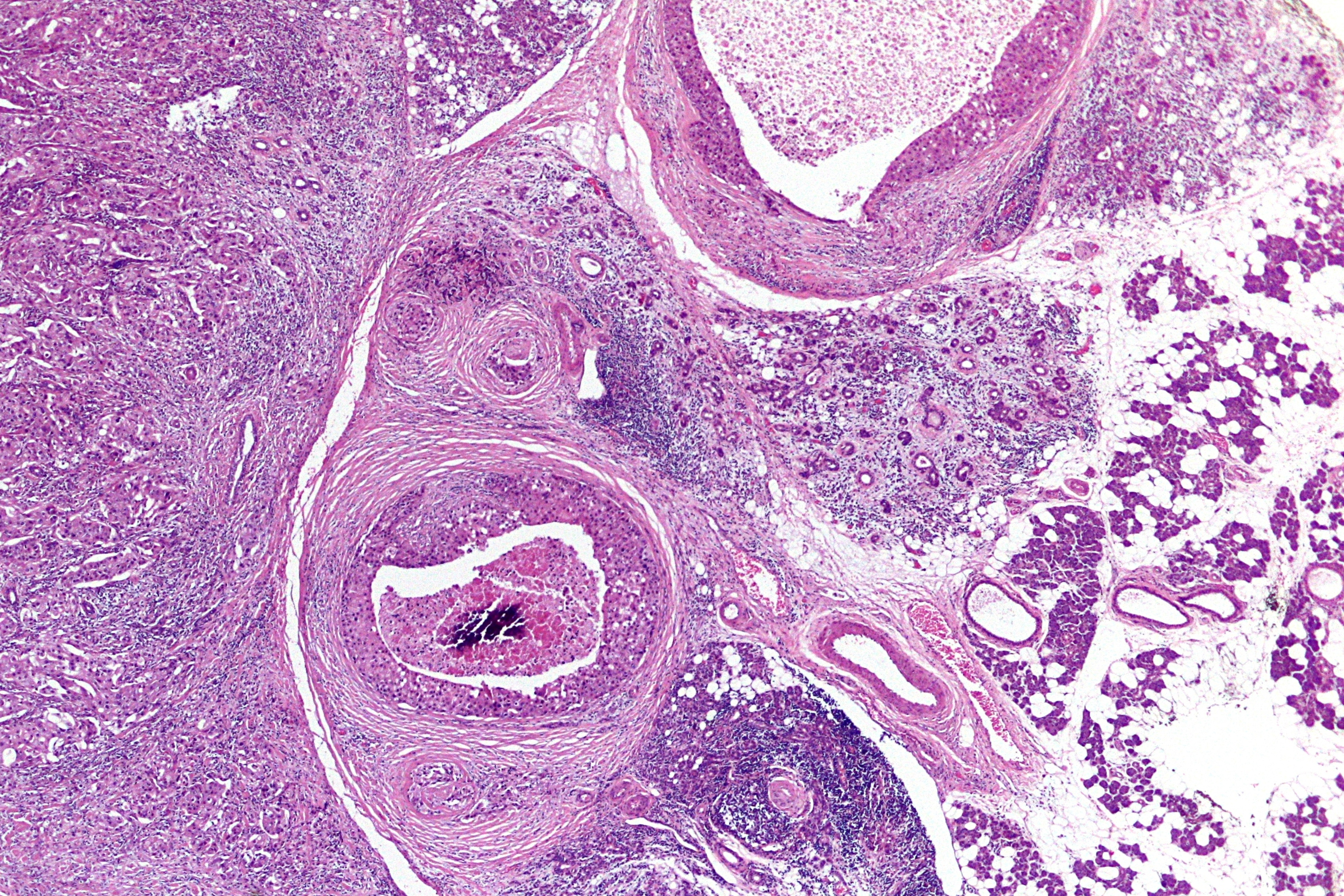
Very low mag.

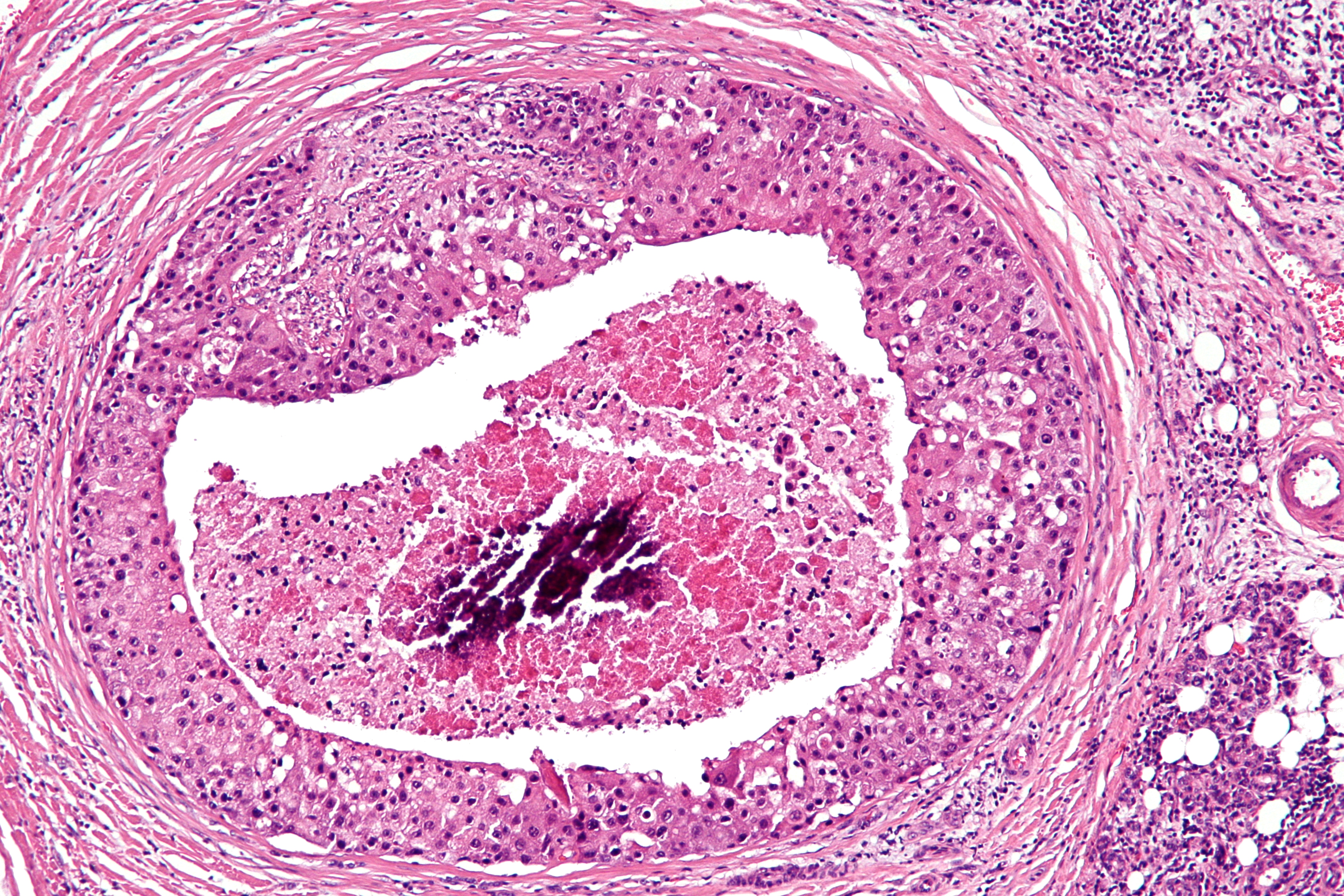
Intermed. mag.

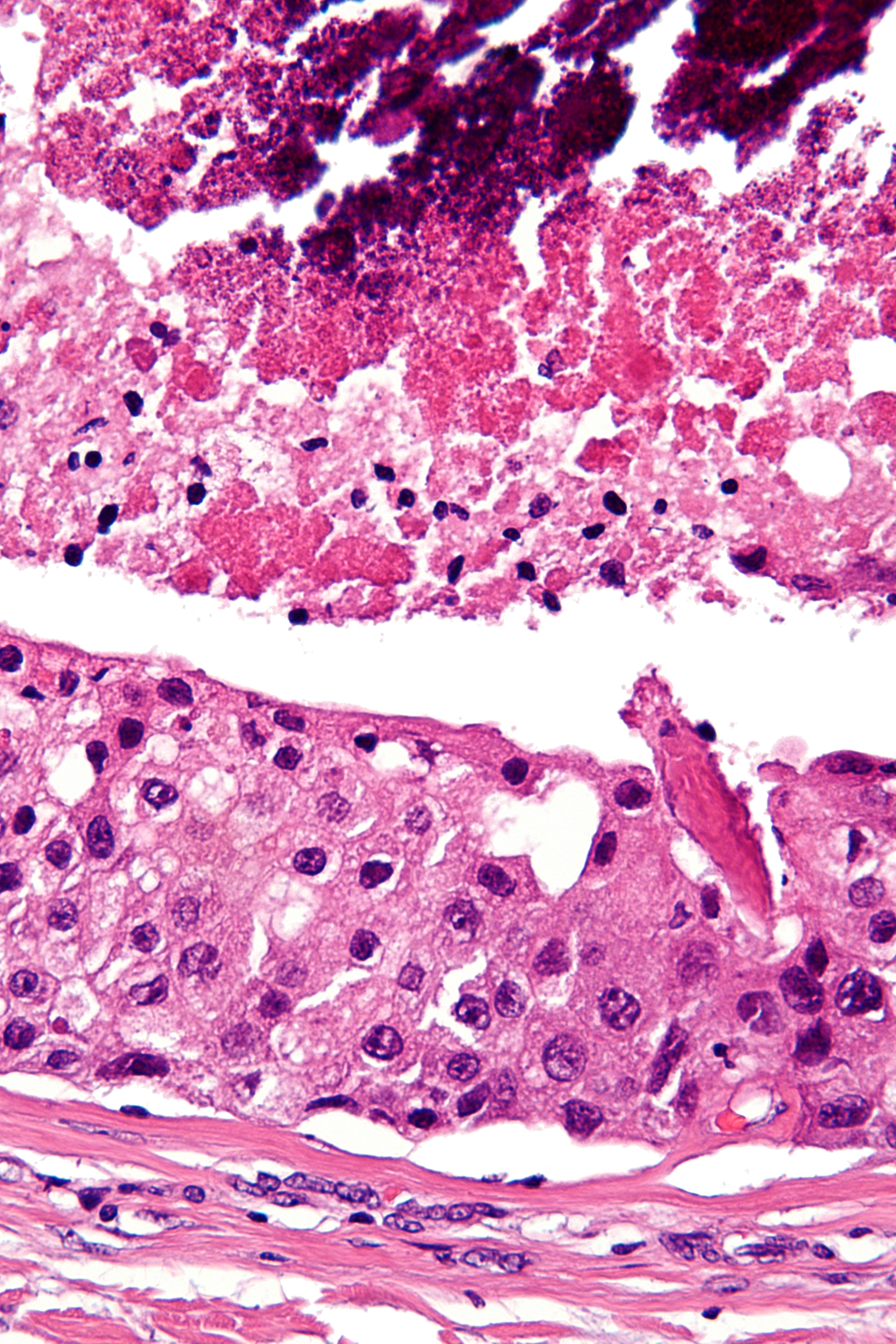
Very high mag.

== See also ==
- Salivary gland
