= GATA5 =

Protein-coding gene in the species Homo sapiens

Identifiers
- Aliases: GATA5, GATAS, bB379O24.1, GATA binding protein 5, CHTD5
- External IDs: OMIM: 611496; MGI: 109497; GeneCards: GATA5

Gene location (Human)
Chr.	Chromosome 20 (human)
Band	20q13.33	Start	62,463,497 bp
Band	20q13.33	End	62,475,995 bp

Gene location (Mouse)
Chr.	Chromosome 2 (mouse)
Band	2 H4|2 102.85 cM	Start	179,966,926 bp
Band	2 H4|2 102.85 cM	End	179,976,492 bp
RNA expression pattern
Bgee	Human / Mouse (ortholog); Top expressed in: mucosa of ileum; left uterine tube; jejunal mucosa; duodenum; right testis; left testis; body of stomach; right adrenal cortex; urinary bladder; fundus / Top expressed in: jejunum; pyloric antrum; epithelium of stomach; duodenum; crypt of lieberkuhn of small intestine; ileum; mucous cell of stomach; vasculature of trunk; lung parenchyma; intestinal epithelium; More reference expression data
BioGPS	n/a
Gene ontology
Molecular function	DNA binding; sequence-specific DNA binding; RNA polymerase II transcription regulatory region sequence-specific DNA binding; DNA-binding transcription factor activity; DNA-binding transcription activator activity, RNA polymerase II-specific; zinc ion binding; chromatin binding; metal ion binding; cis-regulatory region sequence-specific DNA binding; transcription factor activity, RNA polymerase II distal enhancer sequence-specific binding; DNA-binding transcription factor activity, RNA polymerase II-specific; transcription factor activity, RNA polymerase II core promoter proximal region sequence-specific binding; RNA polymerase II cis-regulatory region sequence-specific DNA binding; protein binding
Cellular component	transcription regulator complex; nucleoplasm; nucleus
Biological process	regulation of transcription, DNA-templated; cellular response to BMP stimulus; blood coagulation; transcription, DNA-templated; positive regulation of transcription, DNA-templated; intestinal epithelial cell differentiation; transcription by RNA polymerase II; positive regulation of transcription by RNA polymerase II; aortic valve morphogenesis; endocardial cushion fusion; negative regulation of cardiac muscle hypertrophy; positive regulation of gene expression; negative regulation of gene expression; positive regulation of Notch signaling pathway involved in heart induction; positive regulation of cardiac endothelial to mesenchymal transition; development of the heart; animal organ morphogenesis; tissue development; cell development; anatomical structure formation involved in morphogenesis; digestive tract development; cardiac muscle tissue development; circulatory system development
Sources:Amigo / QuickGO
Orthologs
Databases	NCBI: entry; OMA: entry
Species	Human	Mouse
Entrez	140628	14464
Ensembl	ENSG00000130700	ENSMUSG00000015627
UniProt	Q9BWX5	P97489
RefSeq (mRNA)	NM_080473	NM_008093
RefSeq (protein)	NP_536721	NP_032119
Location (UCSC)	Chr 20: 62.46 – 62.48 Mb	Chr 2: 179.97 – 179.98 Mb
PubMed search
- Wikidata
View/Edit Human	View/Edit Mouse

Transcription factor GATA-5 is a protein that in humans is encoded by the GATA5 gene.

== Function ==
The protein encoded by this gene is a transcription factor that contains two GATA-type zinc fingers. The encoded protein is known to bind to hepatocyte nuclear factor-1alpha (HNF-1alpha), and this interaction is essential for cooperative activation of the intestinal lactase-phlorizin hydrolase promoter. In other organisms, similar proteins may be involved in the establishment of cardiac smooth muscle cell diversity.

== Role in development ==
Gata5 is a transcription factor. Gata5 regulates the proper development of the heart. Early in embryo development, Gata5 helps in making sure that there are enough heart muscle precursor cells produced to differentiate into the final myocardial cells. It also regulates other genes that are crucial to successful heart development. As pregnancy progresses, Gata 5 is involved in the specification of the heart tissue that becomes the ventricles. Problems can arise when Gata5 is overexpressed. This overexpression can lead to ectopic foci. Ectopic foci are also known as ectopic pacemakers. They are bundles of cells that can cause cardiac pacing that are located in places in the heart where they're not supposed to be. These cells can become excited before the heart is supposed to be excited. This causes the heart to beat and thus contract before it should. Oftentimes, this is not a big deal and the heart naturally reverts to its normal pacing. However, if it's caused by problems with development in the heart – if Gata5 did not express properly in the embryo- then this can lead to constant ectopic foci problems. These problems include tachycardia (the heart beating too fast), bradycardia (the heart beating too slow), or ventricular fibrillation which is a serious condition where the ventricles of the heart aren't pumping consistently and can't get blood out to the body.

== See also ==
- GATA transcription factor
