= VPS33B =

Protein-coding gene in the species Homo sapiens

Identifiers
- Aliases: VPS33B, late endosome and lysosome associated, VPS33B late endosome and lysosome associated
- External IDs: OMIM: 608552; MGI: 2446237; GeneCards: VPS33B

Gene location (Human)
Chr.	Chromosome 15 (human)
Band	15q26.1	Start	90,998,673 bp
Band	15q26.1	End	91,022,603 bp

Gene location (Mouse)
Chr.	Chromosome 7 (mouse)
Band	7|7 D2	Start	79,919,397 bp
Band	7|7 D2	End	79,941,502 bp
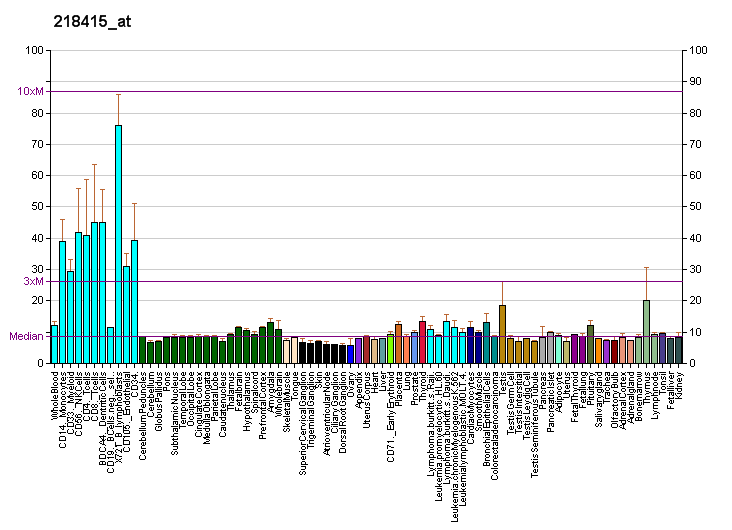

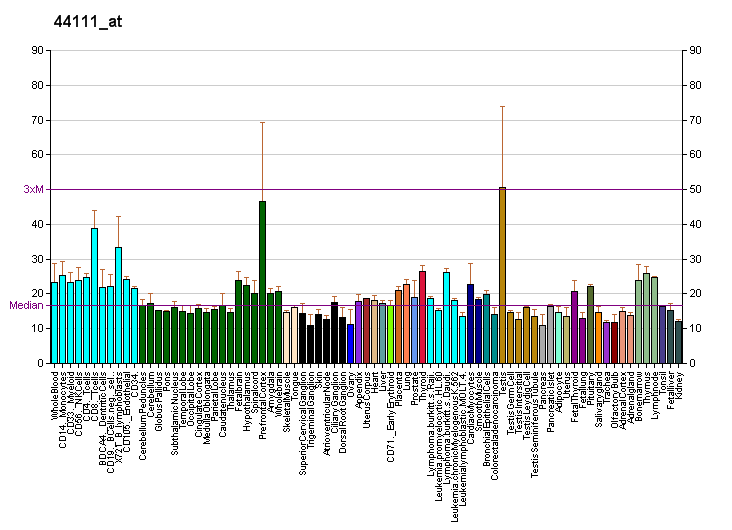
RNA expression pattern
Bgee	Human / Mouse (ortholog); Top expressed in: pancreatic ductal cell; Brodmann area 23; middle temporal gyrus; amniotic fluid; endothelial cell; primary visual cortex; gingival epithelium; cerebellar hemisphere; right hemisphere of cerebellum; retinal pigment epithelium / Top expressed in: secondary oocyte; zygote; supraoptic nucleus; tail of embryo; saccule; neural layer of retina; otic vesicle; primary oocyte; genital tubercle; granulocyte; More reference expression data
BioGPS	More reference expression data
Gene ontology
Molecular function	protein binding
Cellular component	cytoplasm; HOPS complex; platelet alpha granule; recycling endosome; AP-3 adaptor complex; endosome; late endosome; early endosome membrane; membrane; late endosome membrane; clathrin complex; lysosomal membrane; early endosome; perinuclear region of cytoplasm; lysosome; cytoplasmic vesicle; clathrin-coated vesicle
Biological process	megakaryocyte development; endosome to lysosome transport; platelet alpha granule organization; membrane fusion; melanosome localization; endosome organization; vesicle docking involved in exocytosis; autophagosome maturation; lysosome localization; transport; protein transport; vesicle-mediated transport; regulation of platelet aggregation
Sources:Amigo / QuickGO
Orthologs
Databases	NCBI: entry; OMA: entry
Species	Human	Mouse
Entrez	26276	233405
Ensembl	ENSG00000184056	ENSMUSG00000030534
UniProt	Q9H267	P59016
RefSeq (mRNA)	NM_001289148; NM_001289149; NM_018668	NM_178070
RefSeq (protein)	NP_001276077; NP_001276078; NP_061138	NP_835171
Location (UCSC)	Chr 15: 91 – 91.02 Mb	Chr 7: 79.92 – 79.94 Mb
PubMed search
- Wikidata
View/Edit Human	View/Edit Mouse

Vacuolar protein sorting-associated protein 33B is a protein that in humans is encoded by the VPS33B gene.

== Function ==
Vesicle mediated protein sorting plays an important role in segregation of intracellular molecules into distinct organelles. Genetic studies in yeast have identified more than 40 vacuolar protein sorting (VPS) genes involved in vesicle transport to vacuoles. This gene is a member of the Sec-1 domain family, and encodes the human ortholog of rat Vps33b which is homologous to the yeast class C Vps33 protein. The mammalian class C Vps proteins are predominantly associated with late endosomes/lysosomes, and like their yeast counterparts, may mediate vesicle trafficking steps in the endosome/lysosome pathway.
