= GATA transcription factor =

Transcription factor

The GATA transcription factor family consists of six DNA-binding proteins (GATA1-6) that regulate transcription of DNA due to their ability to bind to the DNA sequence "GATA" which can therefore affect different diseases.

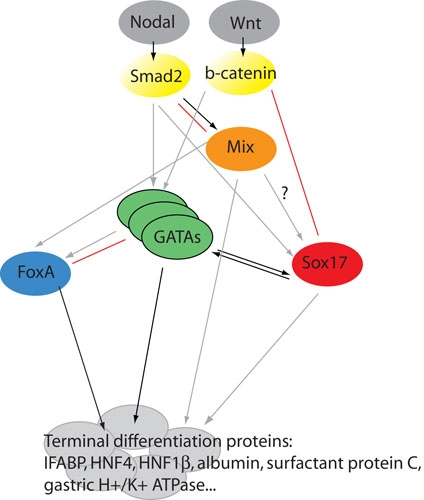
Transcription factor network (including GATA) involved in differentiation of the endoderm.

These six proteins are divided into two subfamilies of GATA1/2/3 and GATA4/5/6 based on differences in differentiation of stem cell tissues. All six proteins are required for differentiating mesoderm derived tissues. The difference is that GATA1/2/3 is required in development and differentiation of ectoderm derived tissues (such as hematopoietic and the central nervous system), while GATA 4/5/6 is for differentiation of endoderm derived tissues (such as embryonic stem cells of the heart and skin. Mutations in the GATA gene leads to problems in the thyroid, ears, kidney, heart, and can cause cancer. GATA can be used as biomarkers in predicting different diseases such as acute megakaryoblastic leukemia (AMKL) in Down syndrome, colorectal, and breast cancer.

GATA transcription factors have been correlated to their broader influence on stem cell development. Findings however, have pointed to a more direct influence by GATA transcription factors, as they are salient components in the more concentrated regulation of gene expression. Data points to the roles GATA transcription factors play in stages past early development in endocrine organs.

== Molecular structure of the GATA transcription factor family ==
In non-vertebrates, the GATA genes are located close together on the chromosomes. Due to evolution, these genes in humans moved apart and are separated into 6 distinct chromosomal regions.To regulate transcription of DNA, GATA transcription factors containing the class IV zinc finger motif look for GATA sites in DNA with two conserved zinc finger involved in long range DNA interactions. In non-vertebrates, GATA transcription factors contain one zinc finger DNA binding domain (ZNI). In humans, GATA transcription factors contain two zinc finger DNA binding domains (ZNI and ZNII) which looks for adenine or thymine before the GATA sequence and adenine or guanine after as shown by the schematic: (A/T)GATA(A/G). Generally, ZNI and ZNII follow the sequence: CX_{2}CX_{17–18}CX_{2}C. 70% of the regions in the zinc finger domains are the same while the terminal amino and carboxyl domains can change.

== Genes ==
In humans:

- GATA1 (see also GATA1)
- GATA2 (see also GATA2)
- GATA3 (see also GATA3)
- GATA4 (see also GATA4)
- GATA5 (see also GATA5)
- GATA6 (see also GATA6)

In yeast:

- GLN3 (see also GLN3)
- GAT1 (see also GAT1)
- DAL80 (see also DAL80)
- GZF3 (see also GZF3)

== Role in breast cancer ==
Despite GATA’s influence on endocrine organs and cell development, they have a complex relation to the development and growth of breast cancer. Its immediate influence is not yet known, its high risk for mutation however, makes determining the immediate influence of paramount importance in battling breast cancer.

Some research that has been done on the GATA transcription factor for its role in the development of breast cancer suggests that a specific GATA transcription factor GATA3 can actually inhibit further growth of breast cancer cells. The complete mechanism in which this happens is still not clear. However, research has suggested that the GATA transcription factor creates an unfavorable chemical environment for the breast cancer tumor cells which inhibits the progression of these cells. One way that has been suggested is that the GATA transcription factor lowers the level of adenosine triphosphate (ATP) in the cell. This creates an unfavorable chemical environment for the breast cancer cells because usually they require high levels of ATP to survive. In addition, research has suggested that there is a specific gene called the TRP1 that is expressed in breast cancer cells and the GATA3 transcription factor plays a role in regulating this gene.
