= List of MeSH codes (D12.776.930) =

The following is a partial list of the "D" codes for Medical Subject Headings (MeSH), as defined by the United States National Library of Medicine (NLM).

This list covers transcription factors. For other protein-related codes, see List of MeSH codes (D12.776).

Codes before these are found at List of MeSH codes (D12.776) § MeSH D12.776.926.550. Codes following these are found at List of MeSH codes (D12.776) § MeSH D12.776.947. For other MeSH codes, see List of MeSH codes.

The source for this content is the set of 2006 MeSH Trees from the NLM.

== MeSH D12.776.930 – transcription factors ==
=== MeSH D12.776.930.125 – basic helix-loop-helix transcription factors ===
==== MeSH D12.776.930.125.500 – basic helix-loop-helix leucine zipper transcription factors ====
- MeSH D12.776.930.125.500.500 – microphthalmia-associated transcription factor
- MeSH D12.776.930.125.500.750 – sterol regulatory element binding proteins
- MeSH D12.776.930.125.500.750.500 – sterol regulatory element binding protein 1
- MeSH D12.776.930.125.500.750.750 – sterol regulatory element binding protein 2

==== MeSH D12.776.930.125.625 – hypoxia-inducible factor 1 ====
- MeSH D12.776.930.125.625.500 – aryl hydrocarbon receptor nuclear translocator
- MeSH D12.776.930.125.625.750 – hypoxia-inducible factor 1, alpha subunit

==== MeSH D12.776.930.125.750 – myogenic regulatory factors ====
- MeSH D12.776.930.125.750.590 – myod protein
- MeSH D12.776.930.125.750.595 – myogenic regulatory factor 5
- MeSH D12.776.930.125.750.600 – myogenin

=== MeSH D12.776.930.127 – basic-leucine zipper transcription factors ===
==== MeSH D12.776.930.127.061 – activating transcription factors ====
- MeSH D12.776.930.127.061.500 – activating transcription factor 1
- MeSH D12.776.930.127.061.750 – activating transcription factor 2
- MeSH D12.776.930.127.061.875 – activating transcription factor 3
- MeSH D12.776.930.127.061.937 – activating transcription factor 4
- MeSH D12.776.930.127.061.968 – activating transcription factor 6

==== MeSH D12.776.930.127.092 – basic helix-loop-helix leucine zipper transcription factors ====
- MeSH D12.776.930.127.092.500 – microphthalmia-associated transcription factor
- MeSH D12.776.930.127.092.750 – sterol regulatory element binding proteins
- MeSH D12.776.930.127.092.750.500 – sterol regulatory element binding protein 1
- MeSH D12.776.930.127.092.750.750 – sterol regulatory element binding protein 2

==== MeSH D12.776.930.127.124 – CCAAT-enhancer-binding proteins ====
- MeSH D12.776.930.127.124.249 – CCAAT-binding factor
- MeSH D12.776.930.127.124.500 – CCAAT-enhancer-binding protein-alpha
- MeSH D12.776.930.127.124.750 – CCAAT-enhancer-binding protein-beta
- MeSH D12.776.930.127.124.812 – CCAAT-enhancer-binding protein-delta
- MeSH D12.776.930.127.124.875 – transcription factor chop
- MeSH D12.776.930.127.124.937 – Y box binding protein 1

==== MeSH D12.776.930.127.500 – maf transcription factors ====
- MeSH D12.776.930.127.500.061 – maf transcription factors, large
- MeSH D12.776.930.127.500.061.500 – mafb transcription factor
- MeSH D12.776.930.127.500.061.625 – oncogene protein v-maf
- MeSH D12.776.930.127.500.061.750 – proto-oncogene proteins c-maf
- MeSH D12.776.930.127.500.500 – maf transcription factors, small
- MeSH D12.776.930.127.500.500.249 – maff transcription factor
- MeSH D12.776.930.127.500.500.500 – mafg transcription factor
- MeSH D12.776.930.127.500.500.750 – mafk transcription factor

==== MeSH D12.776.930.127.656 – nf-e2 transcription factor ====
- MeSH D12.776.930.127.656.750 – maf transcription factors, small
- MeSH D12.776.930.127.656.750.249 – maff transcription factor
- MeSH D12.776.930.127.656.750.500 – mafg transcription factor
- MeSH D12.776.930.127.656.750.750 – mafk transcription factor
- MeSH D12.776.930.127.656.770 – nf-e2 transcription factor, p45 subunit

=== MeSH D12.776.930.155 – core binding factors ===
==== MeSH D12.776.930.155.200 – core binding factor alpha subunits ====
- MeSH D12.776.930.155.200.100 – core binding factor alpha 1 subunit
- MeSH D12.776.930.155.200.200 – core binding factor alpha 2 subunit
- MeSH D12.776.930.155.200.300 – core binding factor alpha 3 subunit

=== MeSH D12.776.930.316 – erythroid-specific dna-binding factors ===
==== MeSH D12.776.930.316.750 – nf-e2 transcription factor ====
- MeSH D12.776.930.316.750.750 – maf transcription factors, small
- MeSH D12.776.930.316.750.750.249 – maff transcription factor
- MeSH D12.776.930.316.750.750.500 – mafg transcription factor
- MeSH D12.776.930.316.750.750.750 – mafk transcription factor
- MeSH D12.776.930.316.750.770 – nf-e2 transcription factor, p45 subunit

=== MeSH D12.776.930.323 – hepatocyte nuclear factors ===
==== MeSH D12.776.930.323.500 – hepatocyte nuclear factor 1 ====
- MeSH D12.776.930.323.500.500 – hepatocyte nuclear factor 1-alpha
- MeSH D12.776.930.323.500.750 – hepatocyte nuclear factor 1-beta

=== MeSH D12.776.930.354 – interferon-stimulated gene factor 3 ===
==== MeSH D12.776.930.354.249 – interferon-stimulated gene factor 3, alpha subunit ====
- MeSH D12.776.930.354.249.500 – stat1 transcription factor
- MeSH D12.776.930.354.249.750 – stat2 transcription factor

=== MeSH D12.776.930.375 – kruppel-like transcription factors ===
==== MeSH D12.776.930.375.750 – sp transcription factors ====
- MeSH D12.776.930.375.750.249 – sp1 transcription factor
- MeSH D12.776.930.375.750.500 – sp2 transcription factor
- MeSH D12.776.930.375.750.750 – sp3 transcription factor
- MeSH D12.776.930.375.750.875 – sp4 transcription factor

=== MeSH D12.776.930.632 – POU domain factors ===
==== MeSH D12.776.930.632.500 – octamer transcription factors ====
- MeSH D12.776.930.632.500.100 – octamer transcription factor-1
- MeSH D12.776.930.632.500.200 – octamer transcription factor-2
- MeSH D12.776.930.632.500.300 – octamer transcription factor-3
- MeSH D12.776.930.632.500.600 – octamer transcription factor-6

==== MeSH D12.776.930.632.625 – transcription factor brn-3 ====
- MeSH D12.776.930.632.625.500 – transcription factor brn-3a
- MeSH D12.776.930.632.625.750 – transcription factor brn-3b
- MeSH D12.776.930.632.625.875 – transcription factor brn-3c

=== MeSH D12.776.930.635 – proto-oncogene proteins c-ets ===
==== MeSH D12.776.930.635.600 – ternary complex factors ====
- MeSH D12.776.930.635.600.100 – ets-domain protein elk-1
- MeSH D12.776.930.635.600.300 – ets-domain protein elk-4

=== MeSH D12.776.930.675 – receptors, retinoic acid ===
==== MeSH D12.776.930.675.500 – retinoid X receptors ====
- MeSH D12.776.930.675.500.500 – retinoid X receptor alpha
- MeSH D12.776.930.675.500.625 – retinoid X receptor beta
- MeSH D12.776.930.675.500.750 – retinoid X receptor gamma

=== MeSH D12.776.930.682 – receptors, steroid ===
==== MeSH D12.776.930.682.074 – coup transcription factors ====
- MeSH D12.776.930.682.074.249 – coup transcription factor i
- MeSH D12.776.930.682.074.500 – coup transcription factor ii

==== MeSH D12.776.930.682.350 – receptors, estrogen ====
- MeSH D12.776.930.682.350.174 – estrogen receptor alpha
- MeSH D12.776.930.682.350.262 – estrogen receptor beta
- MeSH D12.776.930.682.350.350 – receptors, estradiol

==== MeSH D12.776.930.682.530 – receptors, mineralocorticoid ====
- MeSH D12.776.930.682.530.150 – receptors, aldosterone

=== MeSH D12.776.930.806 – smad proteins ===
==== MeSH D12.776.930.806.500 – smad proteins, receptor-regulated ====
- MeSH D12.776.930.806.500.100 – smad1 protein
- MeSH D12.776.930.806.500.200 – smad2 protein
- MeSH D12.776.930.806.500.300 – smad3 protein
- MeSH D12.776.930.806.500.500 – smad5 protein
- MeSH D12.776.930.806.500.800 – smad8 protein

=== MeSH D12.776.930.930 – transcription factors, general ===
==== MeSH D12.776.930.930.875 – transcription factors, tfii ====
- MeSH D12.776.930.930.875.374 – transcription factor tfiia
- MeSH D12.776.930.930.875.562 – transcription factor tfiib
- MeSH D12.776.930.930.875.750 – transcription factor tfiid
- MeSH D12.776.930.930.875.750.500 – tata-box binding protein
- MeSH D12.776.930.930.875.875 – transcription factor tfiih
- MeSH D12.776.930.930.875.875.500 – xeroderma pigmentosum group d protein

==== MeSH D12.776.930.930.937 – transcription factors, tfiii ====
- MeSH D12.776.930.930.937.249 – transcription factor tfiiia
- MeSH D12.776.930.930.937.500 – transcription factor tfiiib

=== MeSH D12.776.930.955 – transcriptional elongation factors ===
==== MeSH D12.776.930.955.500 – positive transcriptional elongation factor b ====
- MeSH D12.776.930.955.500.500 – cyclin-dependent kinase 9

=== MeSH D12.776.930.977 – winged-helix transcription factors ===
==== MeSH D12.776.930.977.249 – forkhead transcription factors ====
- MeSH D12.776.930.977.249.500 – hepatocyte nuclear factor 3-alpha
- MeSH D12.776.930.977.249.750 – hepatocyte nuclear factor 3-beta
- MeSH D12.776.930.977.249.875 – hepatocyte nuclear factor 3-gamma

The list continues at List of MeSH codes (D12.776) § MeSH D12.776.947.
