= Retinoic acid receptor alpha =

Protein found in humans

RARA
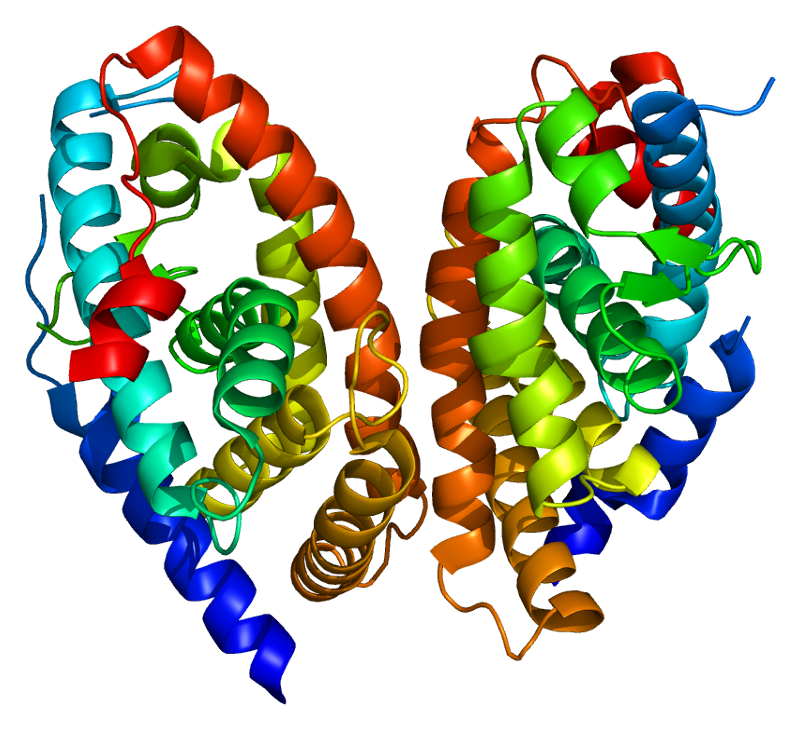

Identifiers
- Aliases: RARA, NR1B1, RAR, retinoic acid receptor alpha, RARalpha
- External IDs: OMIM: 180240; MGI: 97856; GeneCards: RARA
Available structures
PDB	Ortholog search: PDBe RCSB
PDB	List of PDB id codes 1DKF, 1DSZ, 3A9E, 3KMR, 3KMZ, 4DQM, 5K13

Gene location (Human)
Chr.	Chromosome 17 (human)
Band	17q21.2	Start	40,309,180 bp
Band	17q21.2	End	40,357,643 bp

Gene location (Mouse)
Chr.	Chromosome 11 (mouse)
Band	11 D|11 62.76 cM	Start	98,818,644 bp
Band	11 D|11 62.76 cM	End	98,865,768 bp
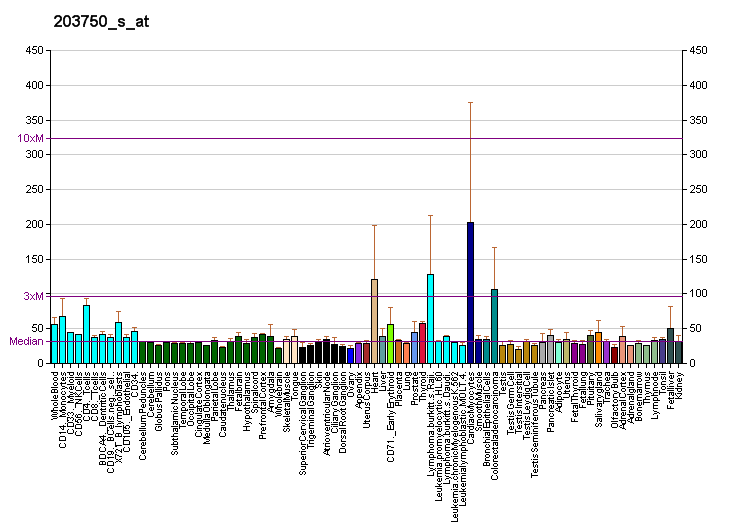

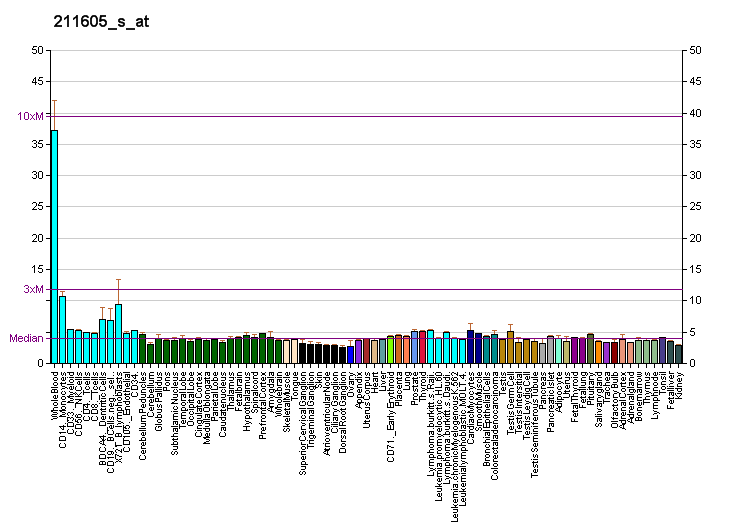

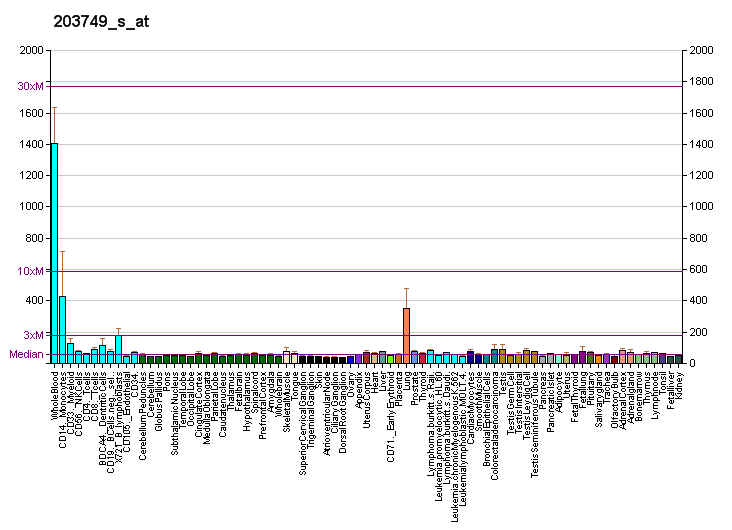
RNA expression pattern
Bgee	Human / Mouse (ortholog); Top expressed in: lactiferous duct; monocyte; granulocyte; blood; gallbladder; right lung; left uterine tube; upper lobe of left lung; tibial arteries; canal of the cervix / Top expressed in: granulocyte; genital tubercle; tail of embryo; lip; yolk sac; spermatocyte; neural layer of retina; spermatid; molar; female urethra; More reference expression data
BioGPS	More reference expression data
Gene ontology
Molecular function	retinoic acid binding; transcription corepressor activity; protein domain specific binding; DNA-binding transcription factor activity; nuclear receptor activity; mRNA 5'-UTR binding; signaling receptor binding; RNA polymerase II transcription regulatory region sequence-specific DNA binding; retinoic acid-responsive element binding; transcription factor binding; metal ion binding; steroid hormone receptor activity; enzyme binding; zinc ion binding; protein binding; DNA binding; sequence-specific DNA binding; transcription coactivator activity; protein kinase A binding; protein kinase B binding; translation repressor activity, mRNA regulatory element binding; alpha-actinin binding; protein heterodimerization activity; chromatin DNA binding; DNA-binding transcription factor activity, RNA polymerase II-specific; histone deacetylase binding; transcription cis-regulatory region binding; nuclear receptor coactivator activity; signaling receptor activity
Cellular component	cytoplasm; actin cytoskeleton; perinuclear region of cytoplasm; neuron projection; nucleus; cell surface; nucleoplasm; soma; dendrite; cytosol; RNA polymerase II transcription regulator complex
Biological process	growth plate cartilage development; germ cell development; cellular response to retinoic acid; ureteric bud development; positive regulation of interleukin-5 production; prostate gland development; limb development; apoptotic cell clearance; chondroblast differentiation; regulation of granulocyte differentiation; protein phosphorylation; response to vitamin A; face development; spermatogenesis; response to ethanol; negative regulation of cell population proliferation; steroid hormone mediated signaling pathway; regulation of apoptotic process; response to cytokine; negative regulation of translation; regulation of transcription, DNA-templated; negative regulation of cell differentiation; negative regulation of gene expression; transcription, DNA-templated; cellular response to estrogen stimulus; positive regulation of transcription, DNA-templated; positive regulation of cell cycle; regulation of myelination; positive regulation of neuron differentiation; negative regulation of tumor necrosis factor production; transcription initiation from RNA polymerase II promoter; trachea cartilage development; glandular epithelial cell development; male gonad development; negative regulation of cartilage development; response to retinoic acid; negative regulation of granulocyte differentiation; multicellular organism growth; female pregnancy; negative regulation of apoptotic process; negative regulation of transcription by RNA polymerase II; positive regulation of interleukin-4 production; regulation of synaptic plasticity; outflow tract septum morphogenesis; negative regulation of transcription, DNA-templated; negative regulation of interferon-gamma production; response to estradiol; negative regulation of translational initiation; embryonic camera-type eye development; positive regulation of interleukin-13 production; neural tube closure; positive regulation of binding; retinoic acid receptor signaling pathway; positive regulation of gene expression; Sertoli cell fate commitment; positive regulation of cell population proliferation; positive regulation of T-helper 2 cell differentiation; ventricular cardiac muscle cell differentiation; liver development; cellular response to lipopolysaccharide; bone development; hippocampus development; signal transduction; positive regulation of transcription by RNA polymerase II; multicellular organism development; hormone-mediated signaling pathway; cell differentiation; response to lipid; gland development; bone morphogenesis; epithelium development
Sources:Amigo / QuickGO
Orthologs
Databases	NCBI: entry; OMA: entry
Species	Human	Mouse
Entrez	5914	19401
Ensembl	ENSG00000131759	ENSMUSG00000037992
UniProt	P10276; Q6I9R7	P11416
RefSeq (mRNA)	NM_000964; NM_001024809; NM_001033603; NM_001145301; NM_001145302	NM_001176528; NM_001177302; NM_001177303; NM_009024; NM_001361954
RefSeq (protein)	NP_000955; NP_001019980; NP_001138773; NP_001138774; NP_000955.1 NP_001138773.1	NP_001169999; NP_001170773; NP_001170774; NP_033050; NP_001348883
Location (UCSC)	Chr 17: 40.31 – 40.36 Mb	Chr 11: 98.82 – 98.87 Mb
PubMed search
- Wikidata
View/Edit Human	View/Edit Mouse

Retinoic acid receptor alpha (RAR-α), also known as NR1B1 (nuclear receptor subfamily 1, group B, member 1), is a nuclear receptor that in humans is encoded by the RARA gene.

NR1B1 is a gene with a protein product and has a chromosomal location of 17q21.2. RARA codes for the nuclear hormone receptor retinoic acid receptor, alpha subtype, a transcription factor. There are another two subtypes of RARs: beta and gamma subtypes.

== Function ==
Retinoid signaling is transduced by two families of nuclear receptors, retinoic acid receptor (RAR) and retinoid X receptor (RXR), which form RXR/RAR heterodimers. In the absence of ligand, DNA-bound RXR/RARA represses transcription by recruiting the corepressors NCOR1, SMRT (NCOR2), and histone deacetylase. When ligand binds to the complex, it induces a conformational change allowing the recruitment of coactivators, histone acetyltransferases, and the basic transcription machinery.

Retinoic acid receptor-alpha, the protein, interacts with retinoic acid, a derivative of vitamin A, which plays an important role in cell growth, differentiation, and the formation of organs in embryonic development.

Once retinoic acid binds to the RAR, the heterodimer initiates transcription and allows for its target genes to be expressed.

== Clinical significance ==
RA signaling has been correlated with several signaling pathways in early embryonic development. First, it participates in the formation of the embryonic axis, which establishes symmetry in the offspring. RA also influences neural differentiation by regulating the expression of pro-neural induction factor Neurogenin 2 (Neurog2). RA affects cardiogenesis, as it plays a role specifically in the formation of the atrial chambers of the heart. RA also plays a role in the development of the pancreas, kidneys, lungs, and extremities.

Translocations that always involve rearrangement of the RARA gene are a cardinal feature of acute promyelocytic leukemia (APL; MIM 612376). The most frequent translocation is t(15,17)(q21;q22), which fuses the RARA gene with the PML gene.

== Acute promyeloid leukemia ==
RARA plays an important role in the establishment of the immune system by inducing T-regulatory cells, promoting tolerance, and controlling the differentiation of immature immune cells in the bone marrow called promyelocytes into mature white blood cells. The prevalence of this gene in the developing immune system leaves it subject to possible defects, the most common of which is a condition known as acute promyeloid leukemia (APL), caused by a somatic mutation described by the fusion of RARA and the PML gene located on chromosome 15. This fusion results in the formation of the protein complex PML-RARα. Under normal circumstances, PML produces a tumor suppressing protein that works by inhibiting uncontrolled rapid cell growth. When the two proteins fuse together, their normal functions are hindered, resulting in the accumulation of promyelocytes in the bone marrow unable to differentiate past this immature phase. This fusion makes up for the cause of 98% of APL cases, with some other rare mutations and fusions, notably a translocation fusing RARα with PLFZ on chromosome 11, making up the other 2%. Current treatment approaches include all-trans-retinoic acid (ATRA) which works by targeting and degrading the PML-RARα protein complex, in addition to chemotherapy and platelet transfusions.

== Interactions ==
Retinoic acid receptor alpha has been shown to interact with:

- BAG1,
- CLOCK,
- CCND3,
- NCOA6,
- NCOR1,
- NCOR2,
- NPAS2,
- NRIP1,
- NR0B2,
- NR4A2,
- PML
- RXRA.
- Src,
- TADA3L, and
- ZBTB16.

== Genetic studies ==
Knock-out mice studies showed that a deletion in one of the copies of the RARA gene did not create any observable defect, while deletion of both copies shows symptoms similar to that of vitamin A deficiency. This proved that all three subtypes of RARs work redundantly.

== Ligands ==
Agonists

- AM580 (RARα selective)
- Arotinoid acid (non selective)
- Tamibarotene (RARα selective with some activity at RARβ but low affinity for RARγ) - reverse amide of AM580
- Tretinoin (non selective)

Antagonists

- BMS-189453 (non selective)
- ER-50891
- SR210831C
- YCT529 (selective for RAR-α)

== See also ==
- Retinoic acid receptor
- Retinoic X receptor
- Acute promyelocytic leukemia
