= MED1 =

Protein-coding gene in the species Homo sapiens

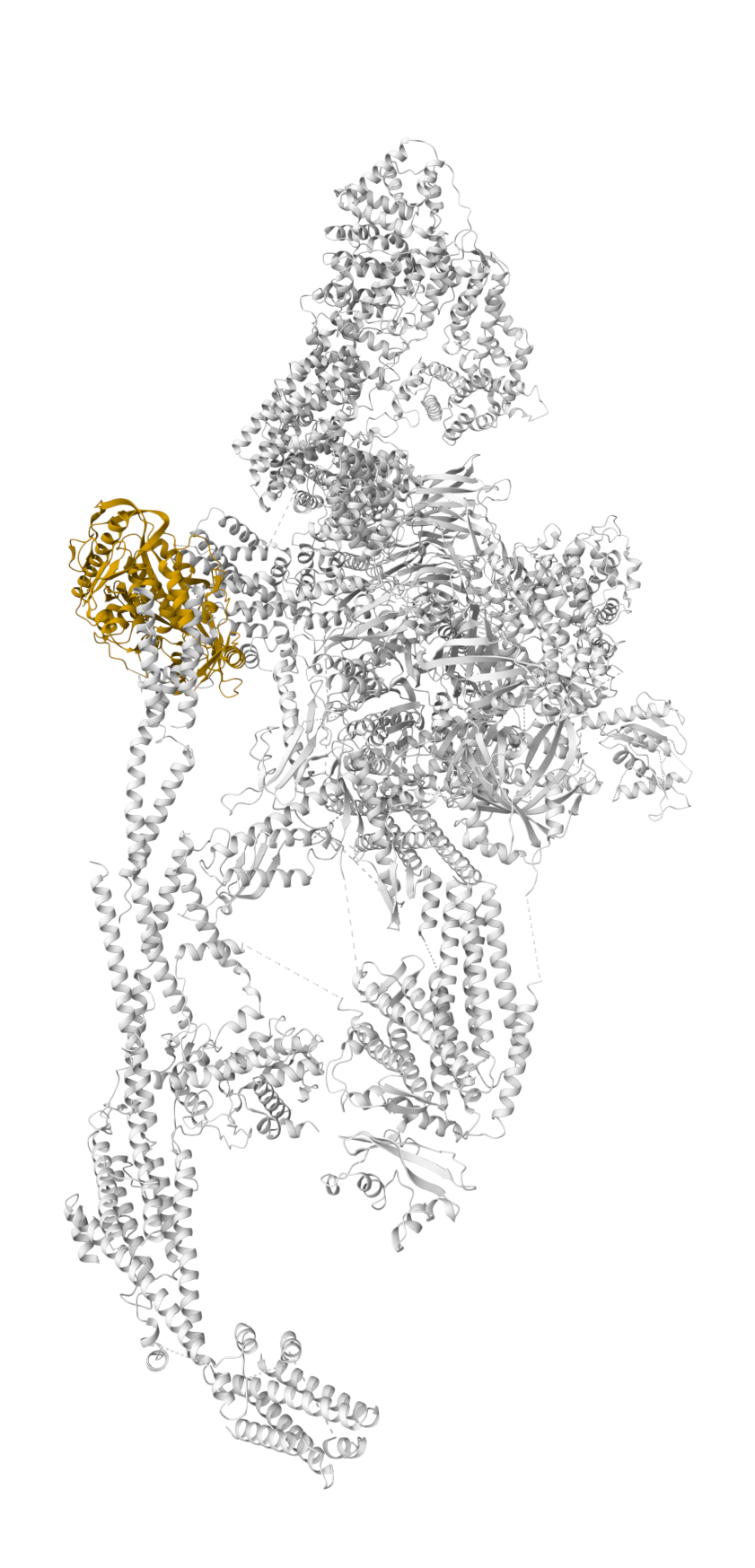

Identifiers
- Aliases: MED1, CRSP1, CRSP200, DRIP205, DRIP230, PBP, PPARBP, PPARGBP, RB18A, TRAP220, TRIP2, mediator complex subunit 1
- External IDs: OMIM: 604311; MGI: 1100846; GeneCards: MED1
Available structures
PDB	Ortholog search: PDBe RCSB
PDB	List of PDB id codes 1RJK, 1RK3, 1RKG, 1RKH, 2O4J, 2O4R, 2ZFX, 3A2H, 3AUN, 3VJS, 3VJT, 3VRT, 3VRU, 3VRV, 3VRW, 3W0G, 3W0H, 3W0I, 3W0J, 3W5P, 3W5Q, 3W5R, 3W5T, 3WT5, 3WT6, 3WT7, 3WTQ, 5AWK, 5AWJ, 4YNK, 5B5B

Gene location (Human)
Chr.	Chromosome 17 (human)
Band	17q12	Start	39,404,285 bp
Band	17q12	End	39,451,272 bp

Gene location (Mouse)
Chr.	Chromosome 11 (mouse)
Band	11 D|11 61.75 cM	Start	98,042,980 bp
Band	11 D|11 61.75 cM	End	98,084,119 bp
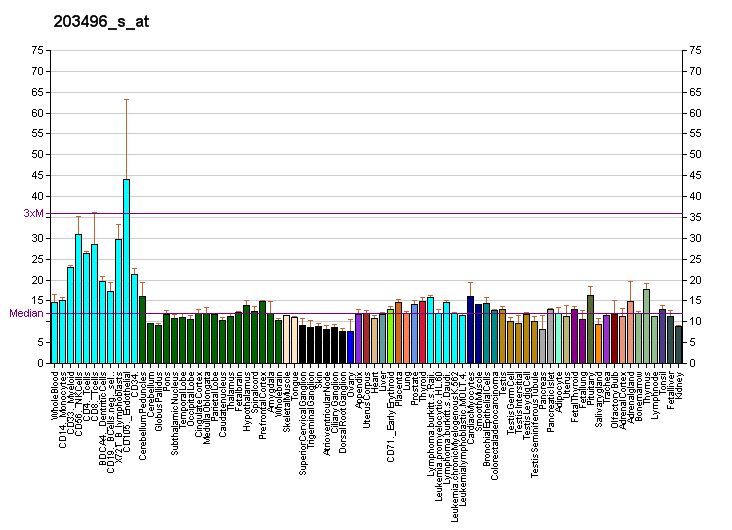

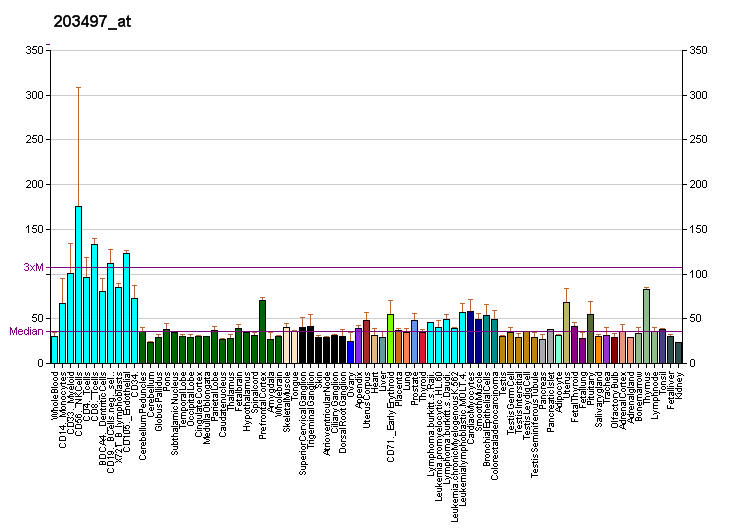
RNA expression pattern
Bgee	Human / Mouse (ortholog); Top expressed in: tendon of biceps brachii; nipple; visceral pleura; lower lobe of lung; mucosa of paranasal sinus; superficial temporal artery; parietal pleura; trabecular bone; human penis; buccal mucosa cell / Top expressed in: Rostral migratory stream; cumulus cell; spermatocyte; spermatid; vestibular membrane of cochlear duct; hair follicle; tail of embryo; otic placode; internal carotid artery; genital tubercle; More reference expression data
BioGPS	More reference expression data
Gene ontology
Molecular function	protein-containing complex binding; DNA-binding transcription factor activity, RNA polymerase II-specific; estrogen receptor binding; ubiquitin protein ligase activity; transcription factor binding; transcription coregulator activity; thyroid hormone receptor binding; RNA polymerase II cis-regulatory region sequence-specific DNA binding; retinoic acid receptor binding; chromatin binding; LBD domain binding; protein binding; nuclear receptor binding; vitamin D receptor binding; DNA binding; mediator complex binding; transcription coactivator activity; peroxisome proliferator activated receptor binding; nuclear receptor coactivator activity; chromatin DNA binding; RNA polymerase II core promoter sequence-specific DNA binding; transcription corepressor activity; signaling receptor activity
Cellular component	membrane; nucleus; mediator complex; nucleolus; chromatin; ubiquitin ligase complex; nucleoplasm; protein-DNA complex
Biological process	regulation of RNA biosynthetic process; thyroid hormone mediated signaling pathway; negative regulation of neuron differentiation; regulation of transcription by RNA polymerase II; monocyte differentiation; embryonic heart tube development; androgen biosynthetic process; epithelial cell proliferation involved in mammary gland duct elongation; enucleate erythrocyte development; animal organ regeneration; angiogenesis; animal organ morphogenesis; regulation of transcription, DNA-templated; negative regulation of keratinocyte proliferation; positive regulation of erythrocyte differentiation; regulation of transcription by RNA polymerase I; ERK1 and ERK2 cascade; in utero embryonic development; mammary gland branching involved in pregnancy; transcription, DNA-templated; positive regulation of transcription, DNA-templated; development of the heart; protein ubiquitination; camera-type eye development; transcription initiation from RNA polymerase II promoter; lactation; cellular response to steroid hormone stimulus; positive regulation of intracellular estrogen receptor signaling pathway; peroxisome proliferator activated receptor signaling pathway; cellular response to hepatocyte growth factor stimulus; positive regulation of keratinocyte differentiation; positive regulation of interferon-gamma-mediated signaling pathway; positive regulation of G0 to G1 transition; embryonic placenta development; negative regulation of apoptotic process; intracellular steroid hormone receptor signaling pathway; negative regulation of transcription by RNA polymerase II; retinal pigment epithelium development; ventricular trabecula myocardium morphogenesis; thyroid hormone generation; fat cell differentiation; positive regulation of hepatocyte proliferation; megakaryocyte development; androgen receptor signaling pathway; positive regulation of mammary gland epithelial cell proliferation; mammary gland epithelial cell proliferation; mammary gland branching involved in thelarche; regulation of vitamin D receptor signaling pathway; mRNA transcription by RNA polymerase II; keratinocyte differentiation; regulation of cell cycle; cellular response to epidermal growth factor stimulus; multicellular organism development; positive regulation of signaling receptor activity; brain development; positive regulation of gene expression; lens development in camera-type eye; cell morphogenesis; embryonic hemopoiesis; cellular response to thyroid hormone stimulus; positive regulation of cell population proliferation; liver development; positive regulation of transcription by RNA polymerase II; erythrocyte development; embryonic hindlimb morphogenesis; regulation of lipid metabolic process; protein import into nucleus
Sources:Amigo / QuickGO
Orthologs
Databases	NCBI: entry; OMA: entry
Species	Human	Mouse
Entrez	5469	19014
Ensembl	ENSG00000125686	ENSMUSG00000018160
UniProt	Q15648	Q925J9
RefSeq (mRNA)	NM_004774	NM_001080118; NM_013634; NM_134027; NM_001361950; NM_001361951
RefSeq (protein)	NP_004765	NP_001073587; NP_038662; NP_598788; NP_001348879; NP_001348880
Location (UCSC)	Chr 17: 39.4 – 39.45 Mb	Chr 11: 98.04 – 98.08 Mb
PubMed search
- Wikidata
View/Edit Human	View/Edit Mouse

Mediator of RNA polymerase II transcription subunit 1 also known as DRIP205 or Trap220 is a subunit of the Mediator complex and is a protein that in humans is encoded by the MED1 gene. MED1 functions as a nuclear receptor coactivator.

Med1

Identifiers
- Symbol: Med1
- Pfam: PF10744
- InterPro: IPR019680
Available protein structures:
- PDB: IPR019680 PF10744 (ECOD; PDBsum)
- AlphaFold: IPR019680; PF10744

== Function ==
The activation of gene transcription is a multistep process that is triggered by factors that recognize transcriptional enhancer sites in DNA. These factors work with co-activators to direct transcriptional initiation by the RNA polymerase II apparatus. The mediator of RNA polymerase II transcription subunit 1 protein is a subunit of the CRSP (cofactor required for SP1 activation) complex, which, along with TFIID, is required for efficient activation by SP1. This protein is also a component of other multisubunit complexes [e.g., thyroid hormone receptor-(TR-) associated proteins that interact with TR and facilitate TR function on DNA templates in conjunction with initiation factors and cofactors]. It also regulates p53-dependent apoptosis and it is essential for adipogenesis. This protein is known to have the ability to self-oligomerize.

== Interactions ==
MED1 has been shown to interact with:

- Androgen receptor,
- Calcitriol receptor,
- Cyclin-dependent kinase 8,
- Estrogen receptor alpha,
- Glucocorticoid receptor,
- Hepatocyte nuclear factor 4 alpha,
- P53,
- PPARGC1A,
- TGS1, and
- Thyroid hormone receptor alpha.

== Protein family ==
This entry represents subunit Med1 of the Mediator complex. The Med1 forms part of the Med9 submodule of the Srb/Med complex. It is one of three subunits essential for viability of the whole organism via its role in environmentally-directed cell-fate decisions.
