= Retinoid X receptor beta =

Protein-coding gene in the species Homo sapiens

RXRB
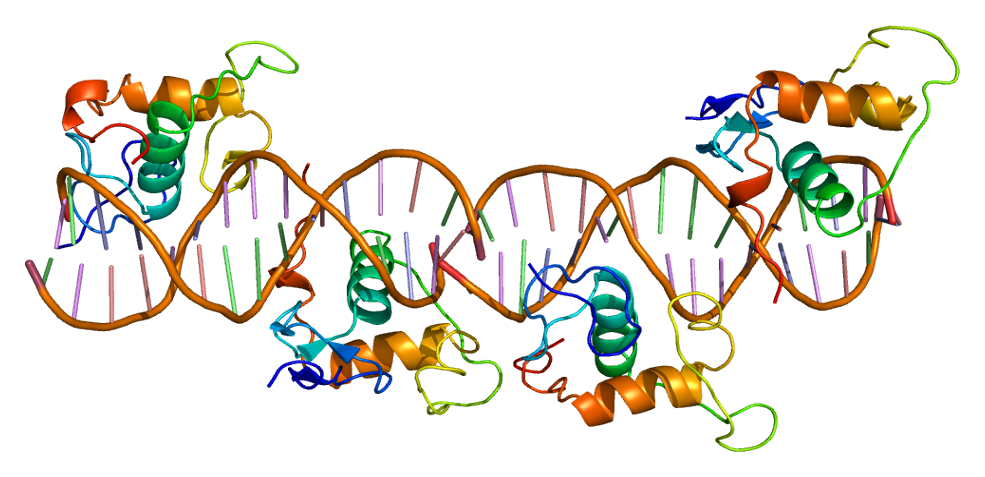

Identifiers
- Aliases: RXRB, DAUDI6, H-2RIIBP, NR2B2, RCoR-1, Retinoid X receptor beta, RXRbeta, RXR-beta
- External IDs: OMIM: 180246; MGI: 98215; GeneCards: RXRB
Available structures
PDB	Ortholog search: PDBe RCSB
PDB	List of PDB id codes 1H9U, 1UHL, 5HJP, 5I4V

Gene location (Human)
Chr.	Chromosome 6 (human)
Band	6p21.32	Start	33,193,588 bp
Band	6p21.32	End	33,200,665 bp

Gene location (Mouse)
Chr.	Chromosome 17 (mouse)
Band	17 B1|17 17.98 cM	Start	34,250,786 bp
Band	17 B1|17 17.98 cM	End	34,257,373 bp
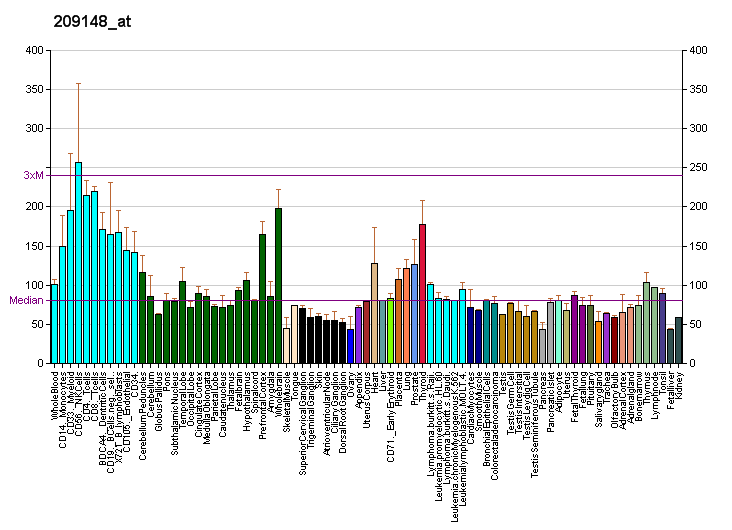

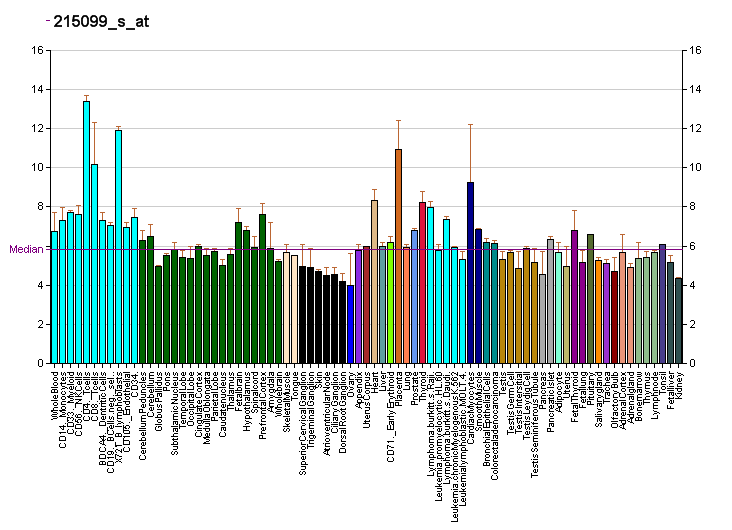

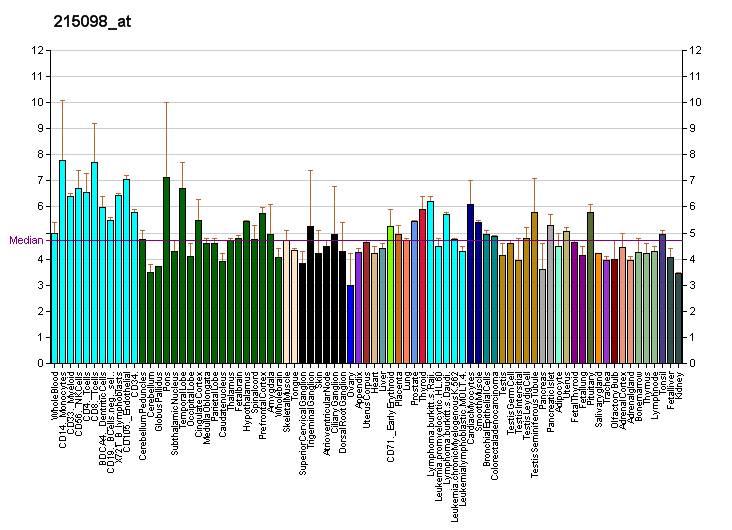
RNA expression pattern
Bgee	Human / Mouse (ortholog); Top expressed in: right lobe of thyroid gland; granulocyte; gastric mucosa; left lobe of thyroid gland; right coronary artery; right uterine tube; body of uterus; right ovary; pituitary gland; canal of the cervix / Top expressed in: Ileal epithelium; internal carotid artery; external carotid artery; granulocyte; renal corpuscle; muscle of thigh; ankle; crypt of lieberkuhn of small intestine; motor neuron; fossa; More reference expression data
BioGPS	More reference expression data
Gene ontology
Molecular function	DNA binding; sequence-specific DNA binding; RNA polymerase II transcription regulatory region sequence-specific DNA binding; DNA-binding transcription factor activity; DNA-binding transcription activator activity, RNA polymerase II-specific; transcription coactivator activity; zinc ion binding; metal ion binding; steroid hormone receptor activity; nuclear receptor activity; protein binding; DNA-binding transcription factor activity, RNA polymerase II-specific
Cellular component	nucleoplasm; nucleus
Biological process	regulation of transcription, DNA-templated; transcription, DNA-templated; retinoic acid receptor signaling pathway; transcription initiation from RNA polymerase II promoter; positive regulation of transcription by RNA polymerase II; steroid hormone mediated signaling pathway; intracellular receptor signaling pathway
Sources:Amigo / QuickGO
Orthologs
Databases	NCBI: entry; OMA: entry
Species	Human	Mouse
Entrez	6257	20182
Ensembl	ENSG00000235712; ENSG00000231321; ENSG00000227322; ENSG00000204231; ENSG00000206289 ENSG00000228333	ENSMUSG00000039656
UniProt	P28702; Q5STP9	P28704
RefSeq (mRNA)	NM_001270401; NM_001291989; NM_021976	NM_001205214; NM_001205215; NM_001205216; NM_011306
RefSeq (protein)	NP_001257330; NP_001278918; NP_068811; NP_068811.1	NP_001192143; NP_001192144; NP_001192145; NP_035436
Location (UCSC)	Chr 6: 33.19 – 33.2 Mb	Chr 17: 34.25 – 34.26 Mb
PubMed search
- Wikidata
View/Edit Human	View/Edit Mouse

Retinoid X receptor beta (RXR-beta), also known as NR2B2 (nuclear receptor subfamily 2, group B, member 2) is a nuclear receptor that in humans is encoded by the RXRB gene.

This gene encodes a member of the retinoid X receptor (RXR) family of nuclear receptors which are involved in mediating the effects of retinoic acid (RA). This receptor forms heterodimers with the retinoic acid, thyroid hormone, and vitamin D receptors, increasing both DNA binding and transcriptional function on their respective response elements. The gene lies within the major histocompatibility complex (MHC) class II region on chromosome 6. An alternatively spliced transcript variant has been described, but its full length sequence has not been determined.

== Interactive pathway map ==
Click on genes, proteins and metabolites below to link to respective articles. (Note: The interactive pathway map can be edited at WikiPathways: "VitaminDSynthesis_WP1531".)

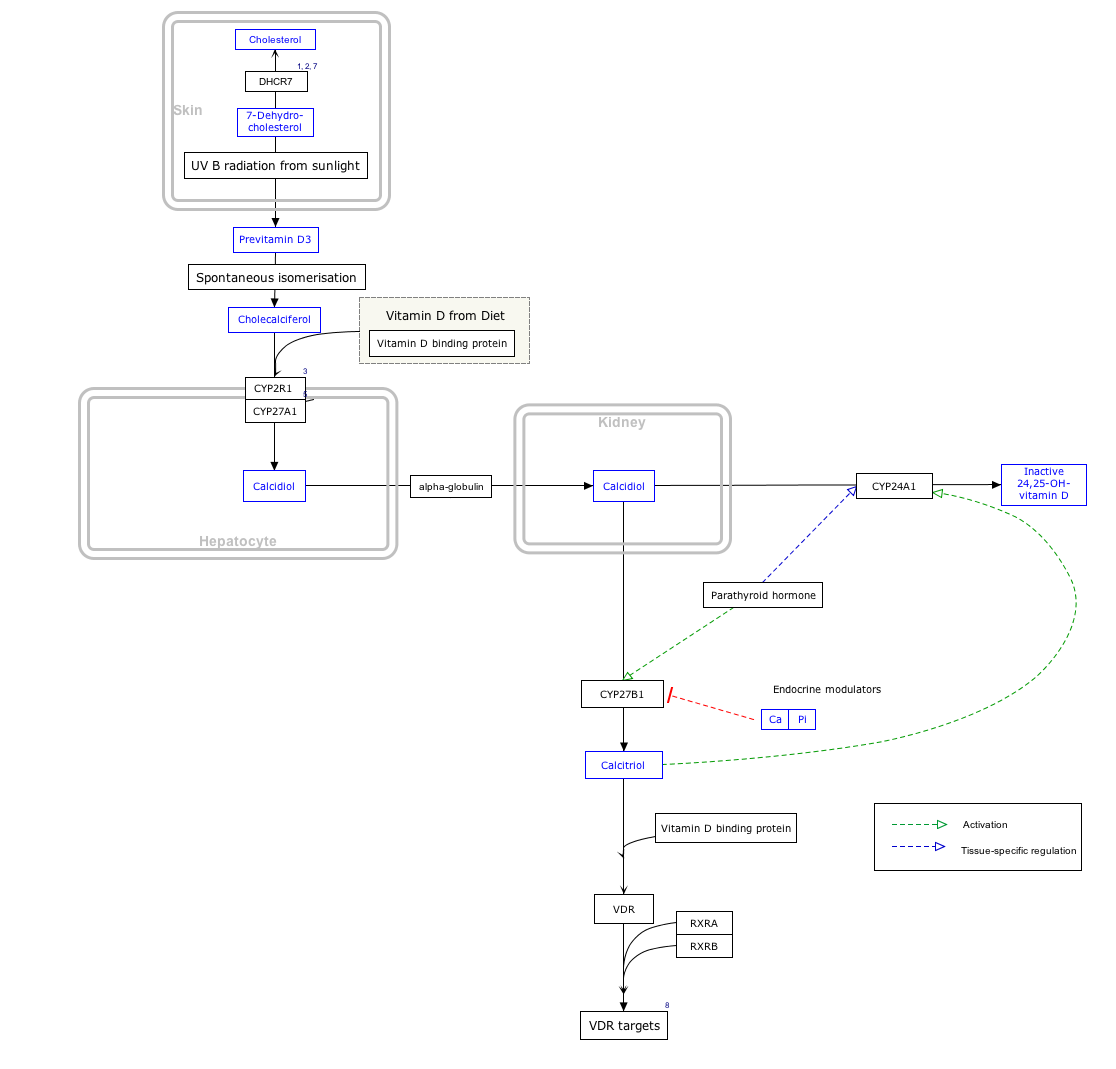

Vitamin D Synthesis Pathway (view / edit)

== See also ==
- Retinoid X receptor
