= Retinoid X receptor alpha =

Protein-coding gene in the species Homo sapiens

RXRA
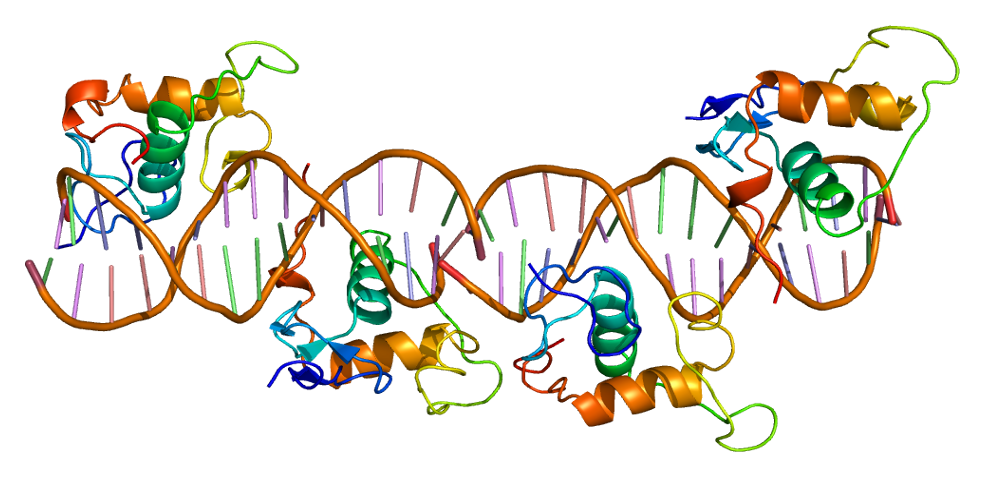

Identifiers
- Aliases: RXRA, NR2B1, Retinoid X receptor alpha, RXR-alpha, RXRalpha
- External IDs: OMIM: 180245; MGI: 98214; GeneCards: RXRA
Available structures
PDB	Ortholog search: PDBe RCSB
PDB	List of PDB id codes 1BY4, 1DSZ, 1FBY, 1FM6, 1FM9, 1G1U, 1G5Y, 1K74, 1LBD, 1MV9, 1MVC, 1MZN, 1R0N, 1RDT, 1RXR, 1XLS, 1XV9, 1XVP, 1YNW, 2ACL, 2NLL, 2P1T, 2P1U, 2P1V, 2ZXZ, 2ZY0, 3DZU, 3DZY, 3E00, 3E94, 3FAL, 3FC6, 3FUG, 3H0A, 3KWY, 3NSP, 3NSQ, 3OAP, 3OZJ, 3PCU, 3R29, 3R2A, 3R5M, 3UVV, 4CN2, 4CN3, 4CN5, 4CN7, 4J5W, 4J5X, 4K4J, 4K6I, 4M8E, 4M8H, 4N5G, 4N8R, 4NQA, 4OC7, 4POH, 4POJ, 4PP3, 4PP5, 4RFW, 4RMC, 4RMD, 4RME, 4ZO1, 5EC9, 4ZSH

Gene location (Human)
Chr.	Chromosome 9 (human)
Band	9q34.2	Start	134,317,098 bp
Band	9q34.2	End	134,440,585 bp

Gene location (Mouse)
Chr.	Chromosome 2 (mouse)
Band	2 A3|2 19.38 cM	Start	27,566,452 bp
Band	2 A3|2 19.38 cM	End	27,652,969 bp
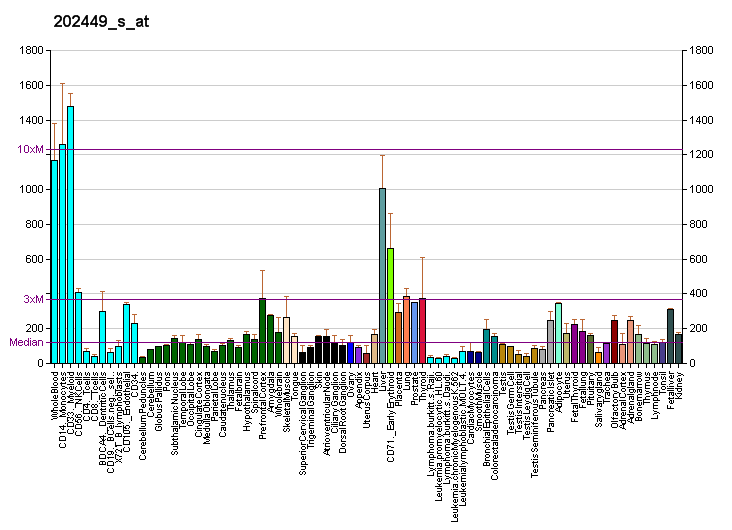

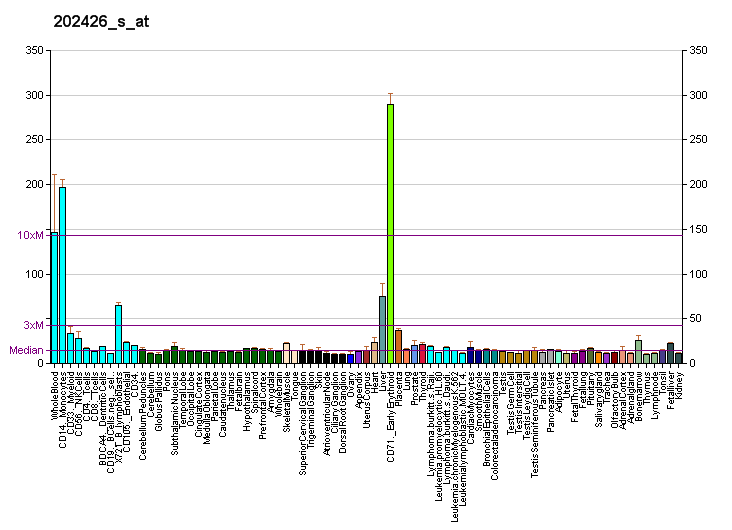
RNA expression pattern
Bgee	Human / Mouse (ortholog); Top expressed in: skin of hip; gingival epithelium; pancreatic ductal cell; gastrocnemius muscle; right lobe of liver; vastus lateralis muscle; Skeletal muscle tissue of rectus abdominis; blood; Skeletal muscle tissue of biceps brachii; trabecular bone / Top expressed in: lip; muscle of thigh; medulla of thymus; left lobe of liver; transitional epithelium of urinary bladder; Ileal epithelium; genital tubercle; medullary collecting duct; ankle; molar; More reference expression data
BioGPS	More reference expression data
Gene ontology
Molecular function	DNA binding; sequence-specific DNA binding; RNA polymerase II transcription regulatory region sequence-specific DNA binding; DNA-binding transcription factor activity; vitamin D response element binding; transcription coactivator activity; transcription factor binding; retinoic acid-responsive element binding; metal ion binding; steroid hormone receptor activity; nuclear receptor activity; protein binding; protein heterodimerization activity; enzyme binding; chromatin DNA binding; vitamin D receptor binding; retinoic acid binding; double-stranded DNA binding; zinc ion binding; nuclear receptor binding; peptide binding; DNA binding domain binding; LBD domain binding; DNA-binding transcription factor activity, RNA polymerase II-specific; signaling receptor activity
Cellular component	receptor complex; nucleoplasm; RNA polymerase II transcription regulator complex; nucleus; protein-containing complex
Biological process	steroid hormone mediated signaling pathway; regulation of branching involved in prostate gland morphogenesis; regulation of transcription, DNA-templated; placenta development; peroxisome proliferator activated receptor signaling pathway; regulation of transcription by RNA polymerase II; cholesterol metabolic process; in utero embryonic development; negative regulation of transcription by RNA polymerase II; cardiac muscle cell proliferation; secretory columnal luminar epithelial cell differentiation involved in prostate glandular acinus development; transcription, DNA-templated; positive regulation of transcription, DNA-templated; ventricular cardiac muscle tissue morphogenesis; development of the heart; retinoic acid receptor signaling pathway; maternal placenta development; modulation by virus of host process; vitamin metabolic process; bile acid and bile salt transport; ventricular cardiac muscle cell differentiation; camera-type eye development; viral process; protein homotetramerization; transcription initiation from RNA polymerase II promoter; embryo implantation; positive regulation of translational initiation by iron; positive regulation of transcription by RNA polymerase II; positive regulation of transcription from RNA polymerase II promoter involved in cellular response to chemical stimulus; response to retinoic acid; regulation of lipid metabolic process
Sources:Amigo / QuickGO
Orthologs
Databases	NCBI: entry; OMA: entry
Species	Human	Mouse
Entrez	6256	20181
Ensembl	ENSG00000186350	ENSMUSG00000015846
UniProt	P19793	P28700
RefSeq (mRNA)	NM_002957; NM_001291920; NM_001291921	NM_001290481; NM_001290482; NM_011305
RefSeq (protein)	NP_001278849; NP_001278850; NP_002948	NP_001277410; NP_001277411; NP_035435
Location (UCSC)	Chr 9: 134.32 – 134.44 Mb	Chr 2: 27.57 – 27.65 Mb
PubMed search
- Wikidata
View/Edit Human	View/Edit Mouse

Retinoid X receptor alpha (RXR-alpha), also known as NR2B1 (nuclear receptor subfamily 2, group B, member 1) is a nuclear receptor that in humans is encoded by the RXRA gene.

== Function ==
Retinoid X receptors (RXRs) are nuclear receptors which form heterodimers with many different nuclear receptors, allowing them to bind to specific sequences in the promoters of target genes and regulate their transcription. For example, RXRA combines with the retinoic acid receptors RARA and RARB, allowing them to mediate the biological effects of retinoids, and in particular enabling retinoic acid-mediated gene activation. In the absence of ligand, the RXR-RAR heterodimers associate with a multiprotein complex containing transcription corepressors that induce histone deacetylation, chromatin condensation and transcriptional suppression. After ligand binding, the corepressors dissociate from the receptors and associate with the coactivators leading to transcriptional activation.

Aside from RARs, RXRA is also known to bind to PPARA, and the RXRA/PPARA heterodimer is required for PPARA transcriptional activity on fatty acid oxidation genes such as ACOX1 and the cytochrome P450 system genes.

== Interactive pathway map ==
Click on genes, proteins and metabolites below to link to respective articles. (Note: The interactive pathway map can be edited at WikiPathways: "VitaminDSynthesis_WP1531".)

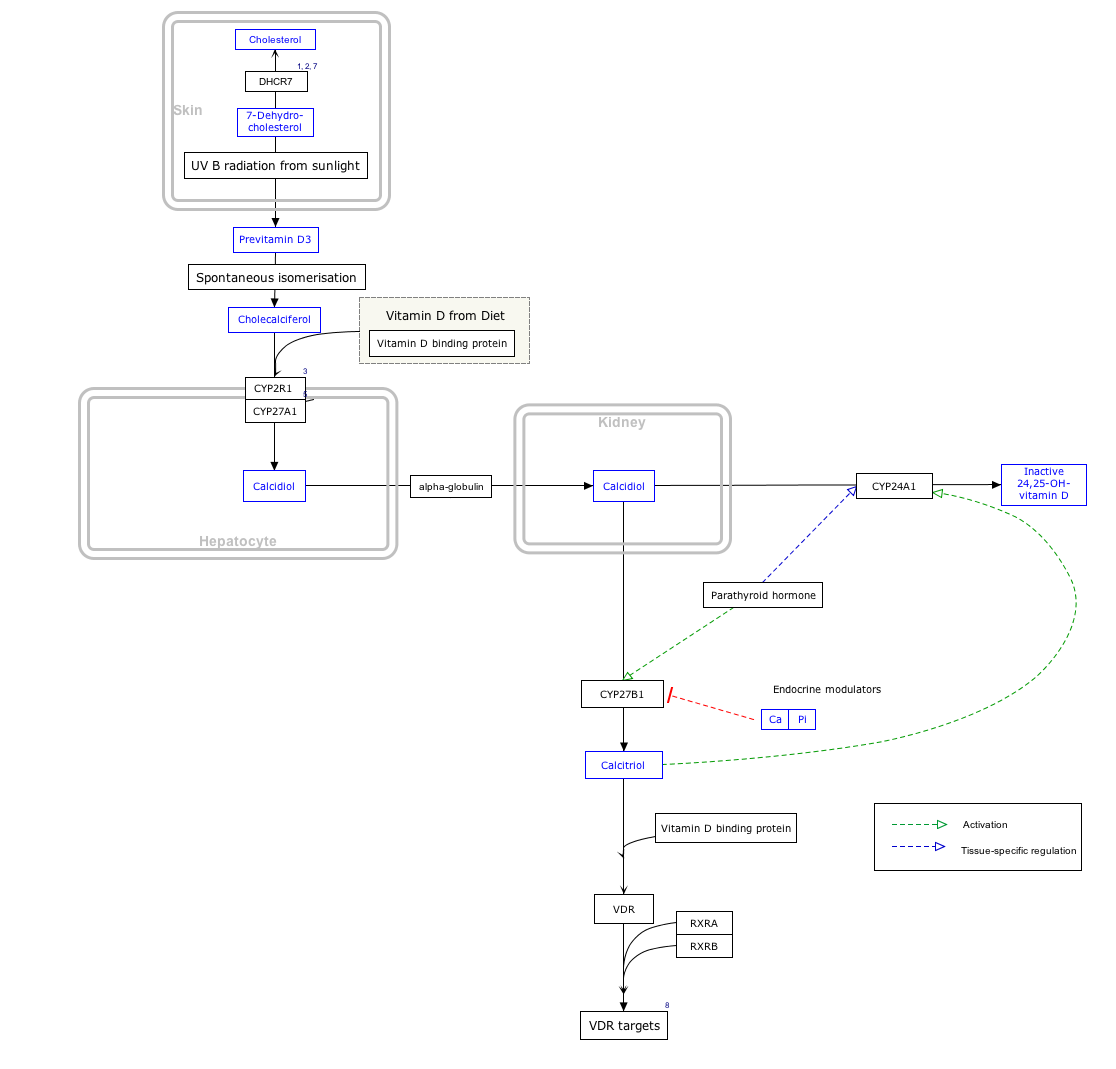

Vitamin D Synthesis Pathway (view / edit)

== Interactions ==
Retinoid X receptor alpha has been shown to interact with:

=== Nuclear Receptor Heterodimeric Partners ===
- RAR-α
- RAR-β
- TR-α
- TR-β
- FXR
- LXR-α
- LXR-β
- PPAR-α
- PPAR-γ
- NR4A1
- PXR (may also form heterotetramer)
- VDR (optional)
- SHP (inhibitory)

=== Other Transcription Factors ===
- CLOCK
- MyoD
- NFKBIB
- NPAS2
- POU2F1
- TBP

=== Transcription Coactivators ===
- BCL3
- BRD8
- ITGB3BP
- NCOA2
- NCOA3
- NCOA6
- PPARGC1A
- TADA3L

=== Others Proteins ===
- IGFBP3
- NRIP1
- RNF8
- TRIM24

== See also ==
- Retinoid X receptor
