= Retinoid X receptor gamma =

Protein found in humans

RXRG
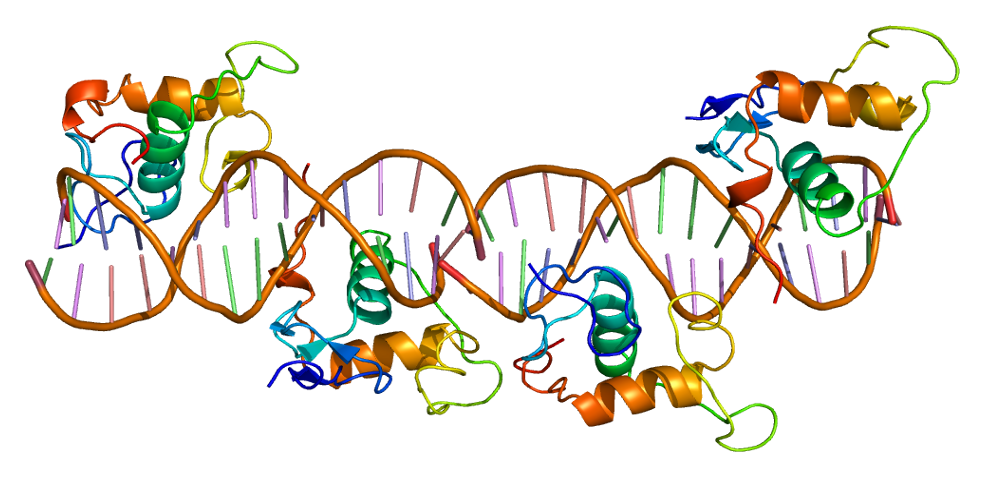

Identifiers
- Aliases: RXRG, NR2B3, RXRC, Retinoid X receptor gamma, RXR-gamma, RXRgamma
- External IDs: OMIM: 180247; MGI: 98216; GeneCards: RXRG
Available structures
PDB	Ortholog search: PDBe RCSB
PDB	List of PDB id codes 2GL8

Gene location (Human)
Chr.	Chromosome 1 (human)
Band	1q23.3	Start	165,400,922 bp
Band	1q23.3	End	165,445,355 bp

Gene location (Mouse)
Chr.	Chromosome 1 (mouse)
Band	1 H2.3|1 74.99 cM	Start	167,425,953 bp
Band	1 H2.3|1 74.99 cM	End	167,467,192 bp
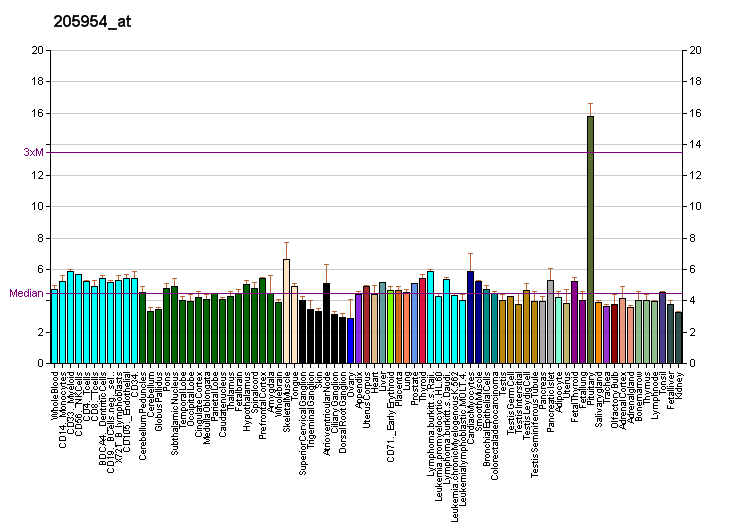
RNA expression pattern
Bgee	Human / Mouse (ortholog); Top expressed in: muscle of thigh; anterior pituitary; gastrocnemius muscle; caudate nucleus; putamen; nucleus accumbens; testicle; C1 segment; islet of Langerhans; tibial nerve / Top expressed in: lumbar spinal ganglion; muscle of thigh; triceps brachii muscle; temporal muscle; quadriceps femoris muscle; vastus lateralis muscle; sternocleidomastoid muscle; myocardium of ventricle; striatum of neuraxis; superior frontal gyrus; More reference expression data
BioGPS	More reference expression data
Gene ontology
Molecular function	DNA-binding transcription factor activity; zinc ion binding; RNA polymerase II transcription regulatory region sequence-specific DNA binding; DNA binding; metal ion binding; sequence-specific DNA binding; steroid hormone receptor activity; protein binding; nuclear receptor activity; DNA-binding transcription factor activity, RNA polymerase II-specific
Cellular component	nucleus; nucleoplasm
Biological process	retinoic acid receptor signaling pathway; regulation of transcription, DNA-templated; positive regulation of transcription by RNA polymerase II; protein homotetramerization; positive regulation of transcription from RNA polymerase II promoter involved in cellular response to chemical stimulus; transcription, DNA-templated; steroid hormone mediated signaling pathway; transcription initiation from RNA polymerase II promoter
Sources:Amigo / QuickGO
Orthologs
Databases	NCBI: entry; OMA: entry
Species	Human	Mouse
Entrez	6258	20183
Ensembl	ENSG00000143171	ENSMUSG00000015843
UniProt	P48443	P28705
RefSeq (mRNA)	NM_001256570; NM_001256571; NM_006917	NM_001159731; NM_009107
RefSeq (protein)	NP_001243499; NP_001243500; NP_008848	NP_001153203; NP_033133
Location (UCSC)	Chr 1: 165.4 – 165.45 Mb	Chr 1: 167.43 – 167.47 Mb
PubMed search
- Wikidata
View/Edit Human	View/Edit Mouse

Retinoid X receptor gamma (RXR-gamma), also known as NR2B3 (nuclear receptor subfamily 2, group B, member 3), is a nuclear receptor that in humans is encoded by the RXRG gene.

== Function ==
This gene encodes a member of the retinoid X receptor (RXR) family of nuclear receptors which are involved in mediating the antiproliferative effects of retinoic acid (RA). This receptor forms heterodimers with the retinoic acid, thyroid hormone, and vitamin D receptors, increasing both DNA binding and transcriptional function on their respective response elements. This gene is expressed at significantly lower levels in non-small cell lung cancer cells. Alternate transcriptional splice variants, encoding different isoforms, have been characterized.

== Interactions ==
Retinoid X receptor gamma has been shown to interact with ITGB3BP.

== See also ==
- Retinoid X receptor
