= Alitretinoin =

Chemical compound

Clinical data
- Trade names: Panretin (gel), Toctino (oral)
- AHFS/Drugs.com: Monograph
- MedlinePlus: a601012
- License data: EU EMA: by INN; US DailyMed: Alitretinoin
- Routes of administration: Topical, by mouth
- ATC code: D11AH04 (WHO) L01XF02 (WHO)

Legal status
- Legal status: UK: POM (Prescription only); US: ℞-only; EU: Rx-only

Pharmacokinetic data
- Protein binding: Highly bound, no exact figure available
- Metabolism: Liver (CYP3A4-mediated oxidation, also isomerised to tretinoin)
- Elimination half-life: 2–10 hours
- Excretion: Urine (64%), faeces (30%)

Identifiers
- IUPAC name: (2E,4E,6Z,8E)-3,7-dimethyl-9-(2,6,6-trimethyl- 1-cyclohexenyl)nona-2,4,6,8-tetraenoic acid
- CAS Number: 5300-03-8
- PubChem CID: 449171
- IUPHAR/BPS: 2645
- DrugBank: DB00523
- ChemSpider: 395778
- UNII: 1UA8E65KDZ
- KEGG: D02815
- ChEBI: CHEBI:50648
- ChEMBL: ChEMBL705
- CompTox Dashboard (EPA): DTXSID6040404
- ECHA InfoCard: 100.111.081

Chemical and physical data
- Formula: C_{20}H_{28}O_{2}
- Molar mass: 300.442 g·mol^{−1}
- 3D model (JSmol): Interactive image
- SMILES: O=C(O)\C=C(\C=C\C=C(/C=C/C1=C(/CCCC1(C)C)C)C)C
- InChI: InChI=1S/C20H28O2/c1-15(8-6-9-16(2)14-19(21)22)11-12-18-17(3)10-7-13-20(18,4)5/h6,8-9,11-12,14H,7,10,13H2,1-5H3,(H,21,22)/b9-6+,12-11+,15-8-,16-14+; Key:SHGAZHPCJJPHSC-ZVCIMWCZSA-N

Alitretinoin, or 9-cis-retinoic acid, is a form of retinoic acid. It is also used in medicine as an antineoplastic (anti-cancer) agent developed by Ligand Pharmaceuticals. It is a first generation retinoid. Ligand gained Food and Drug Administration (FDA) approval for alitretinoin in February 1999.

It was originally thought to be the endogenous ligand for retinoid X receptors, but later work failed to detect its natural production in animal tissue.

== Medical uses ==
=== Kaposi's sarcoma ===
In the United States, topical alitretinoin is indicated for the treatment of skin lesions in AIDS-related Kaposi's sarcoma. Alitretinoin is not indicated when systemic therapy against Kaposi's sarcoma is required. It has received EMA (11 October 2000) and FDA (2 March 1999) approval for this indication.

=== Chronic hand eczema ===
Alitretinoin has been granted prescription rights in the UK (08/09/2008) for in chronic hand eczema as used by mouth. In May 2009 the National Institute for Health and Clinical Excellence (NICE) issued preliminary guidance on the use of alitretinoin for the treatment of severe chronic hand eczema in adults. The recommendation stated that only patients with severe chronic hand eczema who are unresponsive to potent topical corticosteroids, oral immunosuppressants or phototherapy should receive the drug. Final NICE guidance was expected in August 2009.

=== Interactions with other medications ===
Alitretinoin must not be used concurrently with other topical medicine. Insect repellents containing DEET should not be used simultaneously with alitretinoin. Drugs that induce cytochrome P450 isoenzymes may reduce alitretinoin plasma levels.

== Adverse effects ==
=== Systemic use ===
Very common (> 10% frequency):

- Headache
- Hypertriglyceridemia
- High density lipoprotein decreased
- Hypercholesterolemia

Common (1–10% frequency):

- Anaemia
- Increased iron binding capacity
- Monocytes decreased
- Thrombocytes increased
- TSH decreased
- Free T4 decreased
- Flushing
- Conjunctivitis
- Dry eye
- Eye irritation
- Transaminase increased
- Dry skin
- Dry lips
- Cheilitis
- Eczema
- Dermatitis
- Erythema
- Hair loss
- Joint pain
- Muscle pains
- Blood creatine phosphokinase increased

Uncommon (0.1–1% frequency):

- Blurred vision
- Cataracts
- Nose bleeds
- Itchiness
- Rash
- Skin exfoliation
- Asteatotic eczema
- Exostosis
- Ankylosing spondylitis

Rare (< 0.1% frequency):

- Benign intracranial hypertension
- Vasculitis

Unknown frequency:

- Anaphylactic reactions
- Hypersensitivity
- Depression
- Mood changes
- Suicidal ideation
- Decreased night vision

=== Topical use ===
Very common (>10% frequency):

- Rash (77%)
- Pain (34%)
- Itchiness (11%)

Common (1-10% frequency):

- Exfoliative dermatitis
- Oedema
- Skin changes
- Paraesthesia

=== Contraindications ===
Pregnancy is an absolute contraindication as with most other vitamin A products, it should also be avoided when it comes to systemic use in any women that is of childbearing potential and not taking precautions to prevent pregnancy. Toctino (the oral capsule formulation of alitretinoin) contains soya oil and sorbitol. Patients who are allergic to peanut, soya or with rare hereditary fructose intolerance should not take this medicine. It is also contraindicated in nursing mothers. The oral formulation of alitretinoin is contraindicated in patients with:

- Hepatic insufficiency
- Severe chronic kidney disease
- Uncontrolled hypercholesterolemia
- Uncontrolled hypertriglyceridemia
- Uncontrolled hypothyroidism
- Hypervitaminosis A
- Hypersensitivity to any excipients in alitretinoin

=== Interactions ===
It is a CYP3A4 substrate and hence any inhibitor or inducer of this enzyme may alter plasma levels of alitretinoin. It should not be given to patients with excess vitamin A in their system as there is a potential for its actions on the retinoid X receptor to be exacerbated. It may also interact with tetracyclines to cause benign intracranial hypertension.

=== Overdose ===
Alitretinoin is a form of vitamin A. Alitretinoin has been administered in oncological clinical studies at dosages of more than 10-times of the therapeutic dosage given for chronic hand eczema. The adverse effects observed were consistent with retinoid toxicity, and included severe headache, diarrhoea, facial flushing and hypertriglyceridemia. These effects were reversible.

== Pharmacological properties ==
=== Mechanism of action ===
Alitretinoin is believed to be the endogenous ligand (a substance that naturally occurs in the body that activates this receptor) for retinoid X receptor, but it also activates the retinoic acid receptor. More specifically, alitretinoin is believed to act on intracellular nuclear receptors of the RAR and RXR subtypes. The activated receptors function as transcription factors, which subsequently influence cell proliferation and cell differentiation.

Alitretinoin acts on both keratinocytes and dendritic cells. In keratinocytes, it reduces cytokine expression, while in dendritic cells it inhibits the upregulation of the maturation marker CD83 and the co-stimulatory molecules CD80 and CD86. Consequently, these dendritic cells exhibit diminished T cell activation capacity.

=== Absorption and distribution in the body ===
Following oral administration, alitretinoin exhibits variable absorption, which is increased when taken with food. It is extensively bound to plasma proteins. Metabolism occurs in the liver via CYP3A4, forming 4-oxoalitretinoin. The half-life ranges from 2 to 10 hours, and elimination occurs primarily renally.

No significant systemic distribution is observed after dermal application.

== Synthesis ==
Alitretinoin can be synthesized from all-trans retinoic acid through a reaction catalyzed by palladium:
