= ITGB3BP =

Protein-coding gene in humans

Identifiers
- Aliases: ITGB3BP, CENP-R, CENPR, HSU37139, NRIF3, TAP20, integrin subunit beta 3 binding protein
- External IDs: OMIM: 605494; MGI: 1914983; GeneCards: ITGB3BP

Gene location (Human)
Chr.	Chromosome 1 (human)
Band	1p31.3	Start	63,440,770 bp
Band	1p31.3	End	63,593,721 bp

Gene location (Mouse)
Chr.	Chromosome 4 (mouse)
Band	4|4 C6	Start	99,653,639 bp
Band	4|4 C6	End	99,787,010 bp
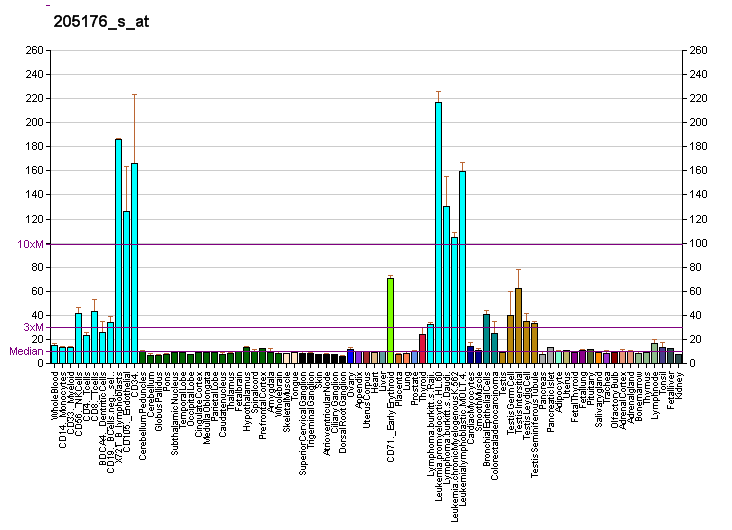
RNA expression pattern
Bgee	Human / Mouse (ortholog); Top expressed in: oocyte; Achilles tendon; secondary oocyte; testicle; right uterine tube; ventricular zone; sperm; ganglionic eminence; gonad; right testis / Top expressed in: testicle; spermatocyte; ventricular zone; spermatid; quadriceps femoris muscle; epiblast; embryo; proximal tubule; right kidney; neural tube; More reference expression data
BioGPS	More reference expression data
Gene ontology
Molecular function	signal transducer activity; protein C-terminus binding; protein binding
Cellular component	cytoplasm; cytosol; membrane; nucleoplasm; chromosome; chromosome, centromeric region; nucleus; kinetochore
Biological process	regulation of transcription, DNA-templated; CENP-A containing chromatin assembly; transcription, DNA-templated; cell division; cell adhesion; positive regulation of apoptotic process; cell cycle; signal transduction; apoptotic process
Sources:Amigo / QuickGO
Orthologs
Databases	NCBI: entry; OMA: entry
Species	Human	Mouse
Entrez	23421	67733
Ensembl	ENSG00000142856	ENSMUSG00000028549
UniProt	Q13352	Q9CQ82
RefSeq (mRNA)	NM_001206739; NM_014288; NM_001347145; NM_001347147; NM_001347148	NM_026348; NM_001362974; NM_001362975; NM_001362976
RefSeq (protein)	NP_001193668; NP_001334074; NP_001334076; NP_001334077; NP_055103	NP_080624; NP_001349903; NP_001349904; NP_001349905
Location (UCSC)	Chr 1: 63.44 – 63.59 Mb	Chr 4: 99.65 – 99.79 Mb
PubMed search
- Wikidata
View/Edit Human	View/Edit Mouse

Centromere protein R is a protein that in humans is encoded by the ITGB3BP gene.

== Interactions ==
ITGB3BP has been shown to interact with:

- CD61,
- Cyclin A2,
- NFKB1,
- RXRA,
- RXRG, and
- THRA.
