= Zinc finger and BTB domain-containing protein 16 =

Protein found in humans

ZBTB16
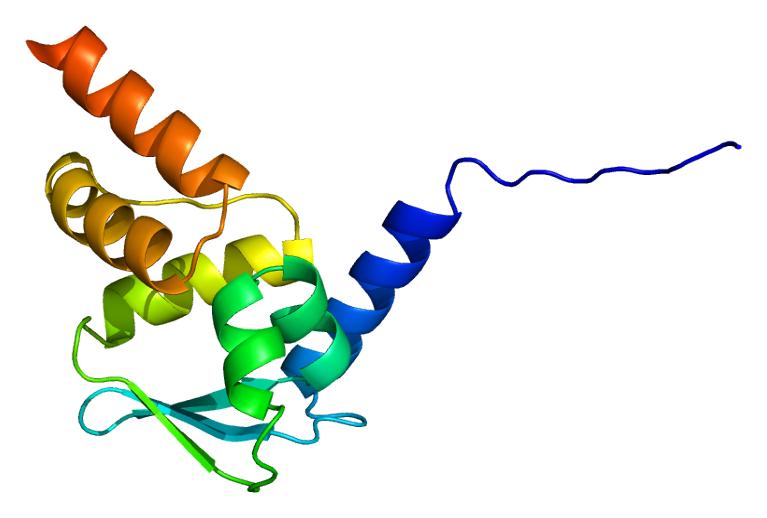

Identifiers
- Aliases: ZBTB16, PLZF, ZNF145, zinc finger and BTB domain containing 16
- External IDs: OMIM: 176797; MGI: 103222; GeneCards: ZBTB16
Available structures
PDB	Ortholog search: PDBe RCSB
PDB	List of PDB id codes 1BUO, 1CS3

Gene location (Human)
Chr.	Chromosome 11 (human)
Band	11q23.2	Start	114,059,041 bp
Band	11q23.2	End	114,256,765 bp

Gene location (Mouse)
Chr.	Chromosome 9 (mouse)
Band	9 A5.3|9 26.47 cM	Start	48,565,597 bp
Band	9 A5.3|9 26.47 cM	End	48,747,522 bp
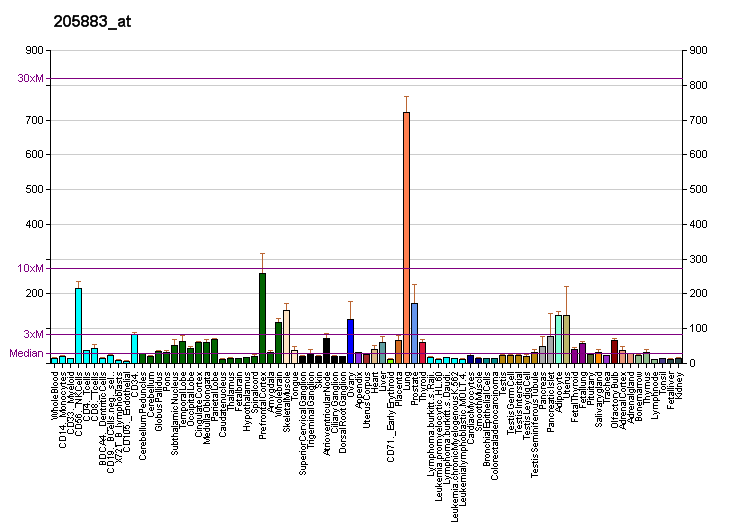
RNA expression pattern
Bgee	Human / Mouse (ortholog); Top expressed in: skin of hip; Brodmann area 23; tibialis anterior muscle; Skeletal muscle tissue of rectus abdominis; pericardium; saphenous vein; skin of thigh; deltoid muscle; biceps brachii; Skeletal muscle tissue of biceps brachii / Top expressed in: extensor digitorum longus muscle; plantaris muscle; digastric muscle; extraocular muscle; aortic valve; gastrula; muscle of thigh; ankle; thoracic diaphragm; soleus muscle; More reference expression data
BioGPS	More reference expression data
Gene ontology
Molecular function	RNA polymerase II cis-regulatory region sequence-specific DNA binding; DNA binding; protein homodimerization activity; DNA-binding transcription factor activity; metal ion binding; DNA-binding transcription repressor activity, RNA polymerase II-specific; protein binding; identical protein binding; nucleic acid binding; double-stranded DNA binding; DNA-binding transcription factor activity, RNA polymerase II-specific; protein C-terminus binding; protein domain specific binding; sequence-specific DNA binding
Cellular component	PML body; nuclear speck; nuclear body; plasma membrane; transcription repressor complex; nucleus; cytosol; protein-containing complex; nucleoplasm
Biological process	embryonic hindlimb morphogenesis; forelimb morphogenesis; skeletal system development; myeloid cell differentiation; regulation of transcription, DNA-templated; embryonic pattern specification; embryonic digit morphogenesis; positive regulation of ossification; negative regulation of transcription by RNA polymerase II; hindlimb morphogenesis; transcription, DNA-templated; mesonephros development; positive regulation of transcription, DNA-templated; central nervous system development; cartilage development; male germ-line stem cell asymmetric division; positive regulation of cartilage development; protein ubiquitination; positive regulation of chondrocyte differentiation; positive regulation of apoptotic process; protein localization to nucleus; positive regulation of NK T cell differentiation; negative regulation of transcription, DNA-templated; positive regulation of fat cell differentiation; negative regulation of myeloid cell differentiation; anterior/posterior pattern specification; negative regulation of cell population proliferation; apoptotic process; post-translational protein modification; hemopoiesis; positive regulation of transcription by RNA polymerase II
Sources:Amigo / QuickGO
Orthologs
Databases	NCBI: entry; OMA: entry
Species	Human	Mouse
Entrez	7704	235320
Ensembl	ENSG00000109906	ENSMUSG00000066687
UniProt	Q05516	Q3UQ17
RefSeq (mRNA)	NM_001018011; NM_006006; NM_001354750; NM_001354751; NM_001354752	NM_001033324; NM_001364543
RefSeq (protein)	NP_001018011; NP_005997; NP_001341679; NP_001341680; NP_001341681	NP_001028496; NP_001351472
Location (UCSC)	Chr 11: 114.06 – 114.26 Mb	Chr 9: 48.57 – 48.75 Mb
PubMed search
- Wikidata
View/Edit Human	View/Edit Mouse

Zinc finger and BTB domain-containing protein 16 is a protein that in humans is encoded by the ZBTB16 gene.

== Function ==
This gene is a member of the Krueppel C2H2-type zinc-finger protein family and encodes a zinc finger transcription factor that contains nine Kruppel-type zinc finger domains at the carboxyl terminus. This protein is located in the nucleus, is involved in cell cycle progression, and interacts with a histone deacetylase. Specific instances of aberrant gene rearrangement at this locus have been associated with acute promyelocytic leukemia (APL) and physiological roles have been identified in mouse Natural Killer T cells and gamma-delta T cells. Alternate transcriptional splice variants have been characterized in human.

== Interactions ==
Zinc finger and BTB domain-containing protein 16 has been shown to interact with:

- Angiotensin II receptor type 1,
- BCL6,
- BMI1,
- Calcitriol receptor,
- FHL2,
- GATA1,
- GATA2,
- HDAC1,
- HDAC4,
- HDAC5,
- HDAC6,
- Heparin-binding EGF-like growth factor,
- Nuclear receptor co-repressor 2,
- Promyelocytic leukemia protein
- RUNX1T1,
- Retinoic acid receptor alpha,
- SIN3A,
- SIN3B, and
- ZBTB32.

== See also ==
- Krüppel
- Zbtb7
