= Trimethylguanosine synthase =

Enzyme found in humans

TGS1

Identifiers
- Aliases: TGS1, NCOA6IP, PIMT, PIPMT, trimethylguanosine synthase 1
- External IDs: OMIM: 606461; MGI: 2151797; GeneCards: TGS1
Available structures
PDB	Ortholog search: PDBe RCSB
PDB	List of PDB id codes 3EGI, 3GDH

Gene location (Human)
Chr.	Chromosome 8 (human)
Band	8q12.1	Start	55,773,446 bp
Band	8q12.1	End	55,826,445 bp

Gene location (Mouse)
Chr.	Chromosome 4 (mouse)
Band	4 A1|4 1.99 cM	Start	3,574,875 bp
Band	4 A1|4 1.99 cM	End	3,616,619 bp
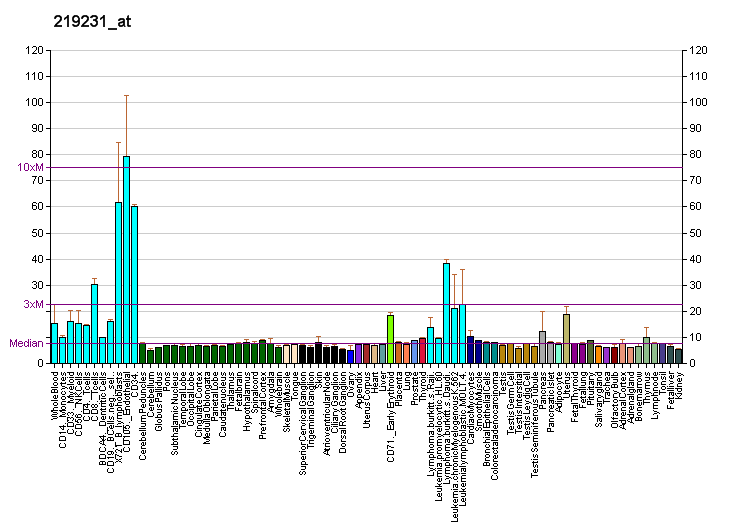
RNA expression pattern
Bgee	Human / Mouse (ortholog); Top expressed in: tendon of biceps brachii; oocyte; secondary oocyte; Achilles tendon; nipple; tail of epididymis; pylorus; internal globus pallidus; renal medulla; corpus epididymis / Top expressed in: tail of embryo; condyle; cumulus cell; genital tubercle; ureter; primitive streak; pineal gland; renal corpuscle; fossa; abdominal wall; More reference expression data
BioGPS	More reference expression data
Gene ontology
Molecular function	methyltransferase activity; transferase activity; RNA trimethylguanosine synthase activity; protein binding; RNA methyltransferase activity
Cellular component	cytoplasm; Cajal body; nucleoplasm; nucleolus; small nuclear ribonucleoprotein complex; nucleus; extracellular space; cytosol
Biological process	regulation of transcription, DNA-templated; transcription, DNA-templated; spliceosomal snRNP assembly; methylation; 7-methylguanosine RNA capping; 7-methylguanosine cap hypermethylation; ribonucleoprotein complex biogenesis; RNA methylation; regulation of lipid metabolic process
Sources:Amigo / QuickGO
Orthologs
Databases	NCBI: entry; OMA: entry
Species	Human	Mouse
Entrez	96764	116940
Ensembl	ENSG00000137574	ENSMUSG00000028233
UniProt	Q96RS0	Q923W1
RefSeq (mRNA)	NM_024831; NM_001317902; NM_001363184	NM_054089
RefSeq (protein)	NP_001304831; NP_079107; NP_001350113	NP_473430
Location (UCSC)	Chr 8: 55.77 – 55.83 Mb	Chr 4: 3.57 – 3.62 Mb
PubMed search
- Wikidata
View/Edit Human	View/Edit Mouse

Trimethylguanosine synthase is an enzyme that in humans is encoded by the TGS1 gene. This enzyme functions to methylate (twice) the 7-monomethylguanosine caps of small nuclear RNAs (snRNAs) and small nucleolar RNAs (snoRNAs), producing trimethylguanosine. This causes snRNAs to concentrate in nuclear foci, and plays a part in transcription regulation.

== Interactions ==
TGS1 has been shown to interact with:

- CREB-binding protein, and
- EED,
- EP300,
- MED1, and
- NCOA6.
