= Retinoid X receptor =

Genes on human chromosome 9

retinoid X receptor alpha

Identifiers
- Symbol: RXRA
- NCBI gene: 6256
- HGNC: 10477
- OMIM: 180245
- RefSeq: NM_002957
- UniProt: P19793

Other data
- Locus: Chr. 9 q34
Search for
- Structures: Swiss-model
- Domains: InterPro

retinoid X receptor beta

Identifiers
- Symbol: RXRB
- NCBI gene: 6257
- HGNC: 10478
- OMIM: 180246
- RefSeq: NM_021976
- UniProt: P28702

Other data
- Locus: Chr. 6 p21.3
Search for
- Structures: Swiss-model
- Domains: InterPro

retinoid X receptor gamma

Identifiers
- Symbol: RXRG
- NCBI gene: 6258
- HGNC: 10479
- OMIM: 180247
- RefSeq: NM_006917
- UniProt: P48443

Other data
- Locus: Chr. 1 q22-q23
Search for
- Structures: Swiss-model
- Domains: InterPro

The retinoid X receptor (RXR) is an important family of transcription factors that can combine with various nuclear receptors to form a protein dimer, which is often needed for those receptors to perform their functions. It is also a nuclear receptor which is activated by 9-cis retinoic acid, but whether its role as a direct endogenous receptor is important biologically is controversial. It can also bind to 9-cis-13,14-dihydroretinoic acid, which may be an endogenous mammalian RXR-selective agonist. Bexarotene is the only FDA-approved medication that selectively activates the RXRs while exhibiting negligible activity toward the retinoic acid receptors.

There are three retinoic X receptors (RXR): RXR-alpha, RXR-beta, and RXR-gamma, encoded by the RXRA, RXRB, RXRG genes, respectively.

RXR heterodimerizes with multiple nuclear receptors including CAR, FXR, LXR, PPAR, PXR, RAR, TR, ER and VDR. RXRs are permissive co-receptors as only one of six alleles is needed for normal development and health. Given this, it is difficult to extrapolate whether the RXR pathway has its own endogenous activity driven by 9-cis retinoic acid species or whether it merely participates in other pathways, predominantly the retinoic nuclear receptor pathway. Genomic knockout of the RXRs results in obesity resistance while bexarotene treatment causes severe hypothyroidism, suggesting that the RXR pathway functions at least to regulate the thyroid hormone receptor pathway.

== Pharmacology ==
The retinoid X receptors are selectively targeted by certain pharmaceutical retinoids, in particular as part of cancer treatments or to treat severe hand eczema. These including bexarotene and alitretinoin (synthetic 9-cis-retinoic acid), though with the caveat that alitretinoin also has some affinity for the Retinoic Acid Receptors (RARs).
