= Nuclear receptor coactivator 2 =

Protein-coding gene in the species Homo sapiens

NCOA2
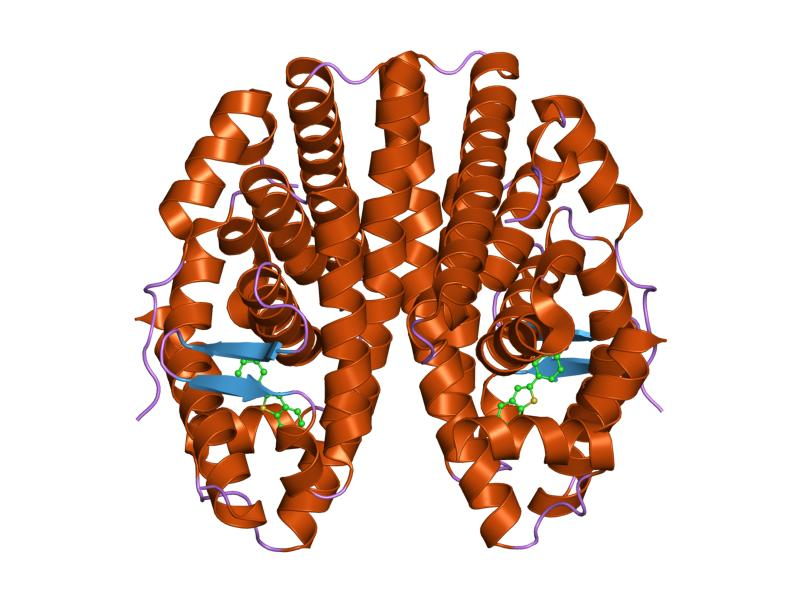

Identifiers
- Aliases: NCOA2, GRIP1, KAT13C, NCoA-2, SRC2, TIF2, bHLHe75, nuclear receptor coactivator 2
- External IDs: OMIM: 601993; MGI: 1276533; GeneCards: NCOA2
Available structures
PDB	Ortholog search: PDBe RCSB
PDB	List of PDB id codes 1GWQ, 1GWR, 1M2Z, 1MV9, 1MVC, 1MZN, 1P93, 1T63, 1T65, 1UHL, 1YOK, 1ZDT, 1ZDU, 1ZKY, 2AO6, 2B1V, 2B1Z, 2B23, 2FAI, 2G44, 2G5O, 2P15, 2P1T, 2P1U, 2P1V, 2Q7J, 2Q7L, 2ZXZ, 2ZY0, 3A9E, 3DZU, 3DZY, 3E00, 3E7C, 3E94, 3FUG, 3GN8, 3K23, 3KWY, 3KYT, 3L0E, 3L0L, 3O1D, 3O1E, 3OAP, 3OZJ, 3PCU, 3PLZ, 3Q95, 3Q97, 3R5M, 3UP0, 3UP3, 4DOS, 4E2J, 4FHH, 4FHI, 4IA1, 4IA2, 4IA3, 4IA7, 4IQR, 4IU7, 4IUI, 4IV2, 4IV4, 4IVW, 4IVY, 4IW6, 4IW8, 4IWC, 4IWF, 2LDC, 2YJD, 3CLD, 3ERD, 3K22, 4CSJ, 4K4J, 4K6I, 4M8E, 4M8H, 4NIE, 4NQA, 4OC7, 4P6W, 4P6X, 4POH, 4POJ, 4PP3, 4PP5, 4PP6, 4PPP, 4PPS, 4PXM, 4Q0A, 4WG0, 4QE6, 4QE8, 4RFW, 4RMC, 4RMD, 4RME, 4ZN9, 4ZO1, 4RUO, 5APJ, 4UDD, 4PLD, 4PLE, 4UDC, 5APH, 5DMC, 5DKB, 5DMF, 4ZNV, 5DVS, 5DL4, 5E0W, 5E19, 4ZUC, 5DI7, 5I4V, 5E0X, 5E1C, 4ZWK, 5DYD, 5DIG, 5DKG, 5DTV, 5EC9, 5DX3, 5DRM, 5BP6, 5DYB, 5DLR, 5E14, 5DXK, 5DUH, 5DVV, 5DU5, 5DXP, 5DP0, 4ZNS, 5DZ3, 5DXR, 5DXQ, 5DZI, 4ZNT, 4ZNW, 5DID, 5DXM, 5EHJ, 5BQ4, 5DY8, 4ZSH, 5DXB, 5DUG, 5DK9, 5EIT, 5BPR, 5DWJ, 5DWI, 5HYR, 5DKS, 4ZUB, 5EI1, 5DZ0, 4ZNU, 4ZNH, 5E15, 4ZN7, 5DZ1, 5DUE, 4ZWH, 5EGV, 5BNU, 5DIE, 5DKE, 5DWG, 5DZH, 5DRJ, 5DWE

Gene location (Human)
Chr.	Chromosome 8 (human)
Band	8q13.3	Start	70,109,782 bp
Band	8q13.3	End	70,403,808 bp

Gene location (Mouse)
Chr.	Chromosome 1 (mouse)
Band	1 A3|1 4.12 cM	Start	13,139,105 bp
Band	1 A3|1 4.12 cM	End	13,374,083 bp
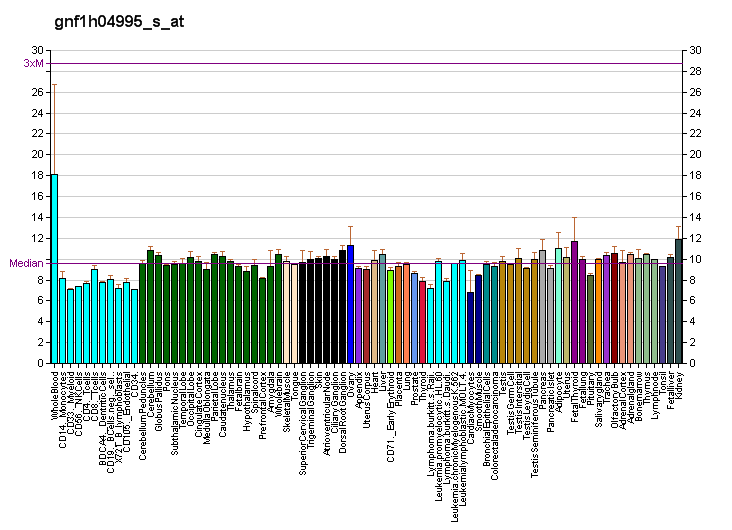
RNA expression pattern
Bgee	Human / Mouse (ortholog); Top expressed in: corpus epididymis; endothelial cell; secondary oocyte; seminal vesicula; jejunal mucosa; amniotic fluid; tibia; Epithelium of choroid plexus; buccal mucosa cell; oral cavity / Top expressed in: substantia nigra; lacrimal gland; ciliary body; left lung lobe; retinal pigment epithelium; lateral geniculate nucleus; habenula; median eminence; lobe of cerebellum; cerebellar vermis; More reference expression data
BioGPS	More reference expression data
Gene ontology
Molecular function	protein dimerization activity; transcription coactivator activity; transcription factor binding; chromatin binding; RNA polymerase II cis-regulatory region sequence-specific DNA binding; protein binding; nuclear receptor coactivator activity; RNA polymerase II intronic transcription regulatory region sequence-specific DNA binding; signaling receptor binding; nuclear receptor binding; aryl hydrocarbon receptor binding; protein domain specific binding; DNA-binding transcription factor activity, RNA polymerase II-specific
Cellular component	cytoplasm; nucleoplasm; nucleus; nuclear body; protein-containing complex
Biological process	regulation of transcription, DNA-templated; cellular response to Thyroglobulin triiodothyronine; rhythmic process; negative regulation of transcription by RNA polymerase II; circadian regulation of gene expression; transcription, DNA-templated; cellular response to hormone stimulus; regulation of glucose metabolic process; circadian rhythm; bile acid and bile salt transport; negative regulation of transcription, DNA-templated; positive regulation of transcription by RNA polymerase II; locomotor rhythm; intracellular receptor signaling pathway; regulation of lipid metabolic process; regulation of gene expression; response to progesterone
Sources:Amigo / QuickGO
Orthologs
Databases	NCBI: entry; OMA: entry
Species	Human	Mouse
Entrez	10499	17978
Ensembl	ENSG00000140396	ENSMUSG00000005886
UniProt	Q15596	Q61026
RefSeq (mRNA)	NM_006540; NM_001321703; NM_001321707; NM_001321711; NM_001321712 NM_001321713	NM_001077695; NM_008678; NM_001302702
RefSeq (protein)	NP_001308632; NP_001308636; NP_001308640; NP_001308641; NP_001308642 NP_006531	NP_001289631; NP_032704
Location (UCSC)	Chr 8: 70.11 – 70.4 Mb	Chr 1: 13.14 – 13.37 Mb
PubMed search
- Wikidata
View/Edit Human	View/Edit Mouse

The nuclear receptor coactivator 2 also known as NCoA-2 is a protein that in humans is encoded by the NCOA2 gene. NCoA-2 is also frequently called glucocorticoid receptor-interacting protein 1 (GRIP1), steroid receptor coactivator-2 (SRC-2), or transcriptional mediators/intermediary factor 2 (TIF2).

== Function ==
NCoA-2 is a transcriptional coregulatory protein that contains several nuclear receptor interacting domains and an intrinsic histone acetyltransferase activity. NCOA2 is recruited to DNA promotion sites by ligand-activated nuclear receptors. NCOA2 in turn acetylates histones, which makes downstream DNA more accessible to transcription. Hence, NCOA2 assists nuclear receptors in the upregulation of DNA expression.

GRIP1 is a transcriptional co-activator of the glucocorticoid receptor and interferon regulatory factor 1 (IRF1).

== Interactions ==
Nuclear receptor coactivator 2 has been shown to interact with:

- AR,
- ARNT,
- BRCA1,
- ESR1,
- NR3C1,
- PPFIA4,
- RXRA,
- VDR.
