= Thyroid hormone receptor alpha =

Protein-coding gene in the species Homo sapiens

THRA
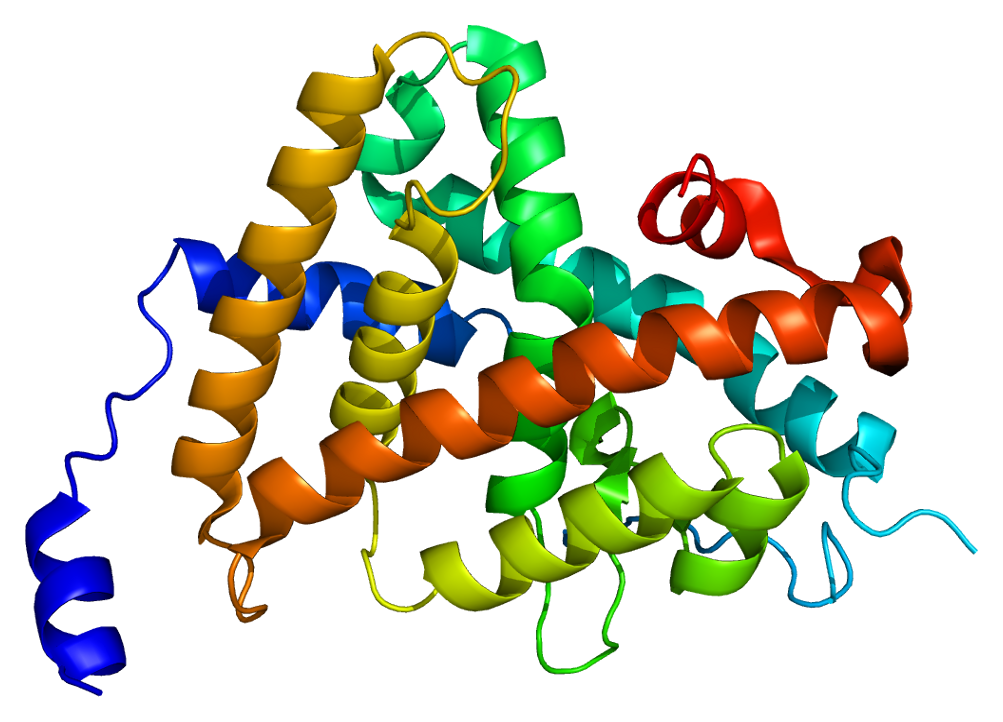

Identifiers
- Aliases: THRA, AR7, CHNG6, EAR7, ERB-T-1, ERBA, ERBA1, NR1A1, THRA1, THRA2, c-ERBA-1, thyroid hormone receptor, alpha, thyroid hormone receptor alpha, TRalpha
- External IDs: OMIM: 190120; MGI: 98742; GeneCards: THRA
Available structures
PDB	Ortholog search: PDBe RCSB
PDB	List of PDB id codes 1NAV, 2H77, 2H79, 3HZF, 3ILZ, 3JZB, 4LNW, 4LNX

Gene location (Human)
Chr.	Chromosome 17 (human)
Band	17q21.1	Start	40,058,290 bp
Band	17q21.1	End	40,093,867 bp

Gene location (Mouse)
Chr.	Chromosome 11 (mouse)
Band	11 D|11 62.58 cM	Start	98,631,464 bp
Band	11 D|11 62.58 cM	End	98,659,832 bp
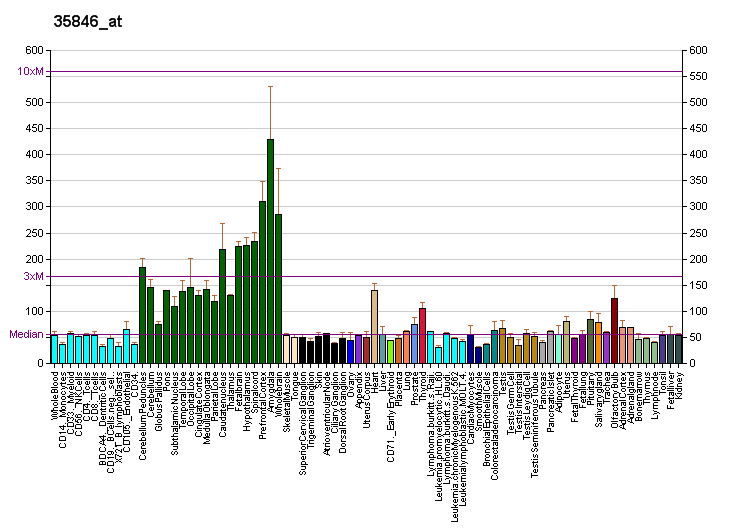

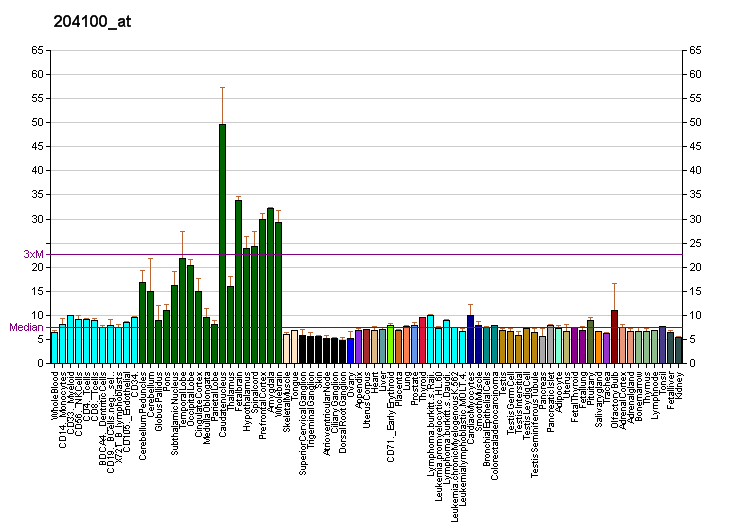
RNA expression pattern
Bgee	Human / Mouse (ortholog); Top expressed in: nucleus accumbens; middle frontal gyrus; amygdala; caudate nucleus; putamen; right frontal lobe; cingulate gyrus; anterior cingulate cortex; cerebellar hemisphere; right hemisphere of cerebellum / Top expressed in: entorhinal cortex; dentate gyrus of hippocampal formation granule cell; perirhinal cortex; CA3 field; primary visual cortex; superior frontal gyrus; neural layer of retina; nucleus of stria terminalis; subiculum; hippocampus proper; More reference expression data
BioGPS	More reference expression data
Gene ontology
Molecular function	transcription cis-regulatory region binding; protein binding; single-stranded RNA binding; zinc ion binding; chromatin DNA binding; nuclear receptor activity; steroid receptor RNA activator RNA binding; transcription factor binding; TBP-class protein binding; steroid hormone receptor activity; DNA binding; protein domain specific binding; sequence-specific DNA binding; metal ion binding; DNA-binding transcription factor activity; thyroid hormone binding; DNA-binding transcription factor activity, RNA polymerase II-specific; protein-containing complex binding; RNA polymerase II transcription regulatory region sequence-specific DNA binding; nuclear receptor coactivator activity; signaling receptor activity
Cellular component	cytoplasm; nucleoplasm; nucleus; cytosol; RNA polymerase II transcription regulator complex
Biological process	regulation of transcription by RNA polymerase II; response to cold; cytoplasmic sequestering of transcription factor; hormone-mediated signaling pathway; regulation of thyroid hormone mediated signaling pathway; thyroid gland development; regulation of transcription, DNA-templated; ossification; female courtship behavior; cartilage condensation; negative regulation of RNA polymerase II transcription preinitiation complex assembly; type I pneumocyte differentiation; transcription, DNA-templated; steroid hormone mediated signaling pathway; transcription by RNA polymerase II; regulation of lipid catabolic process; regulation of heart contraction; animal organ morphogenesis; positive regulation of female receptivity; learning or memory; regulation of myeloid cell apoptotic process; positive regulation of transcription by RNA polymerase II; transcription initiation from RNA polymerase II promoter; erythrocyte differentiation; negative regulation of DNA-templated transcription, initiation; positive regulation of myotube differentiation; negative regulation of transcription, DNA-templated; intracellular receptor signaling pathway; negative regulation of transcription by RNA polymerase II; thyroid hormone mediated signaling pathway; multicellular organism development; brain development; cell differentiation; response to lipid; positive regulation of cold-induced thermogenesis
Sources:Amigo / QuickGO
Orthologs
Databases	NCBI: entry; OMA: entry
Species	Human	Mouse
Entrez	7067	21833
Ensembl	ENSG00000126351	ENSMUSG00000058756
UniProt	P10827	P63058
RefSeq (mRNA)	NM_199334; NM_001190918; NM_001190919; NM_003250	NM_178060; NM_001313983
RefSeq (protein)	NP_001177847; NP_001177848; NP_003241; NP_955366	NP_001300912; NP_835161
Location (UCSC)	Chr 17: 40.06 – 40.09 Mb	Chr 11: 98.63 – 98.66 Mb
PubMed search
- Wikidata
View/Edit Human	View/Edit Mouse

Thyroid hormone receptor alpha (TR-alpha) also known as nuclear receptor subfamily 1, group A, member 1 (NR1A1), is a nuclear receptor protein that in humans is encoded by the THRA gene.

== Function ==
The protein encoded by this gene is a nuclear hormone receptor for triiodothyronine. It is one of the several receptors for thyroid hormone, and has been shown to mediate the biological activities of thyroid hormone. Knockout studies in mice suggest that the different receptors, while having certain extent of redundancy, may mediate different functions of thyroid hormone. Alternatively spliced transcript variants encoding distinct isoforms have been reported.

== Role in pathology ==
Mutations of the THRA gene may cause nongoitrous congenital hypothyroidism-6, a subtype of congenital hypothyroidism.

== Interactions ==
THR1 has been shown to interact with:

- COPS2,
- EP300,
- ITGB3BP,
- MED1,
- MED6,
- MED12,
- MED16,
- MEF2A,
- NCOA6,
- TRIP11, and
- UBC.
