= Thyroid hormone receptor =

Nuclear protein

Thyroid hormone receptor alpha

Identifiers
- Symbol: THRA
- Alt. symbols: THRA1, THRA2, ERBA1
- NCBI gene: 7067
- HGNC: 11796
- OMIM: 190120
- RefSeq: NM_199334
- UniProt: P10827

Other data
- Locus: Chr. 17 q11.2-17q12
Search for
- Structures: Swiss-model
- Domains: InterPro

Thyroid hormone receptor beta

Identifiers
- Symbol: THRB
- Alt. symbols: ERBA2
- NCBI gene: 7068
- HGNC: 11799
- OMIM: 190160
- RefSeq: NM_000461
- UniProt: P10828

Other data
- Locus: Chr. 3 p24.1-p22
Search for
- Structures: Swiss-model
- Domains: InterPro

The thyroid hormone receptor (TR) is a type of nuclear receptor that is activated by binding thyroid hormone. TRs act as transcription factors, ultimately affecting the regulation of gene transcription and translation. These receptors also have non-genomic effects that lead to second messenger activation, and corresponding cellular response.

== Structure ==
There are four domains that are present in all TRs. Two of these, the DNA-binding (DBD) and hinge domains, are involved in the ability of the receptor to bind hormone response elements (HREs). TRs also have a ligand binding domain (LBD) that allows them to bind to thyroid hormone with high affinity. The fourth domain is a transactivation domain which allows the receptor to bind other transcription factors.

== Function ==
Thyroid hormone receptors play critical roles in the regulation of metabolism, heart rate, and development of organisms.

These receptors are typically associated with retinoid X receptors (RXRs), forming heterodimers. In its inactivated form, the TR inhibits gene transcription by binding corepressors. This adds an additional level of regulation to an already tightly regulated process. When activated, these receptors become associated with other activators and initiate gene transcription. TRs are also involved in cell viability, and are believed to have other non-genomic affects that are currently being investigated.

== Mechanism of action ==
Thyroid hormone is transported into the cell through a transporter. Once inside of the cell, the hormone can have genomic or non-genomic effects. The genomic signaling pathway directly influences gene transcription and translation, while the non-genomic pathway involves more rapid, cellular changes, some of which also regulate gene expression through more indirect signaling.

=== Genomic signaling pathway ===
Thyroid hormone receptors regulate gene expression by binding to hormone response elements (HREs) in DNA either as monomers, heterodimers with other nuclear receptors, or homodimers. Dimerizing with different nuclear receptors leads to the regulation of different genes. THR commonly interacts with the retinoid X receptor (RXR), a nuclear retinoic acid receptor. TR/RXR heterodimers are the most transcriptionally active form of TR.

==== Retinoic acid receptors ====
Retinoic acid receptors are located in the nucleus and commonly form complexes with steroid hormone receptors in order to regulate the production of essential gene products. Retinoic acid receptors bind corepressors in the absence of their ligand, retinoic acid, which is formed from the metabolism of vitamin A. Retinoid X receptors are activated by binding to 9-cis-retinoic acid, a specific isomer of retinoic acid. Other retinoic acid receptors are less specific, allowing them to bind isomers of retinoic acid with similar affinities.

Once RXRs bind ligand, they undergo conformational changes that reduce their affinity for corepressors—allowing them to attract coactivators to the transcription site. Once all of the necessary cofactors are present, the presence of a DNA binding domain permits the binding of response elements, initiating gene transcription. Due to their role in gene regulation, studies have shown that these receptors are necessary for growth and development.

==== Regulation of TRE gene products ====
In the absence of hormone, TR forms a complex with corepressor proteins such as nuclear receptor co-repressor 1 (N-CoR) and 2 (N-CoR2). While these cofactors are present, TR binds HREs in a transcriptionally inactive state. This inhibition of gene transcription allows for tight regulation of gene products. Binding of thyroid hormone results in a conformational change in helix 12 of the TR transactivation domain, which displaces the corepressors from the receptor/DNA complex. Coactivator proteins are recruited, forming a DNA/TR/coactivator complex. One coactivator recruited to the site is nuclear receptor co-activator 1 (NCoA-1). RNA polymerase is recruited to the site and transcribes downstream DNA into messenger RNA (mRNA). The mRNA generated is then translated into the corresponding proteins. The protein products from this process drive the changes in cell function observed in the presence of thyroid hormone.

=== Non-genomic signaling pathway ===
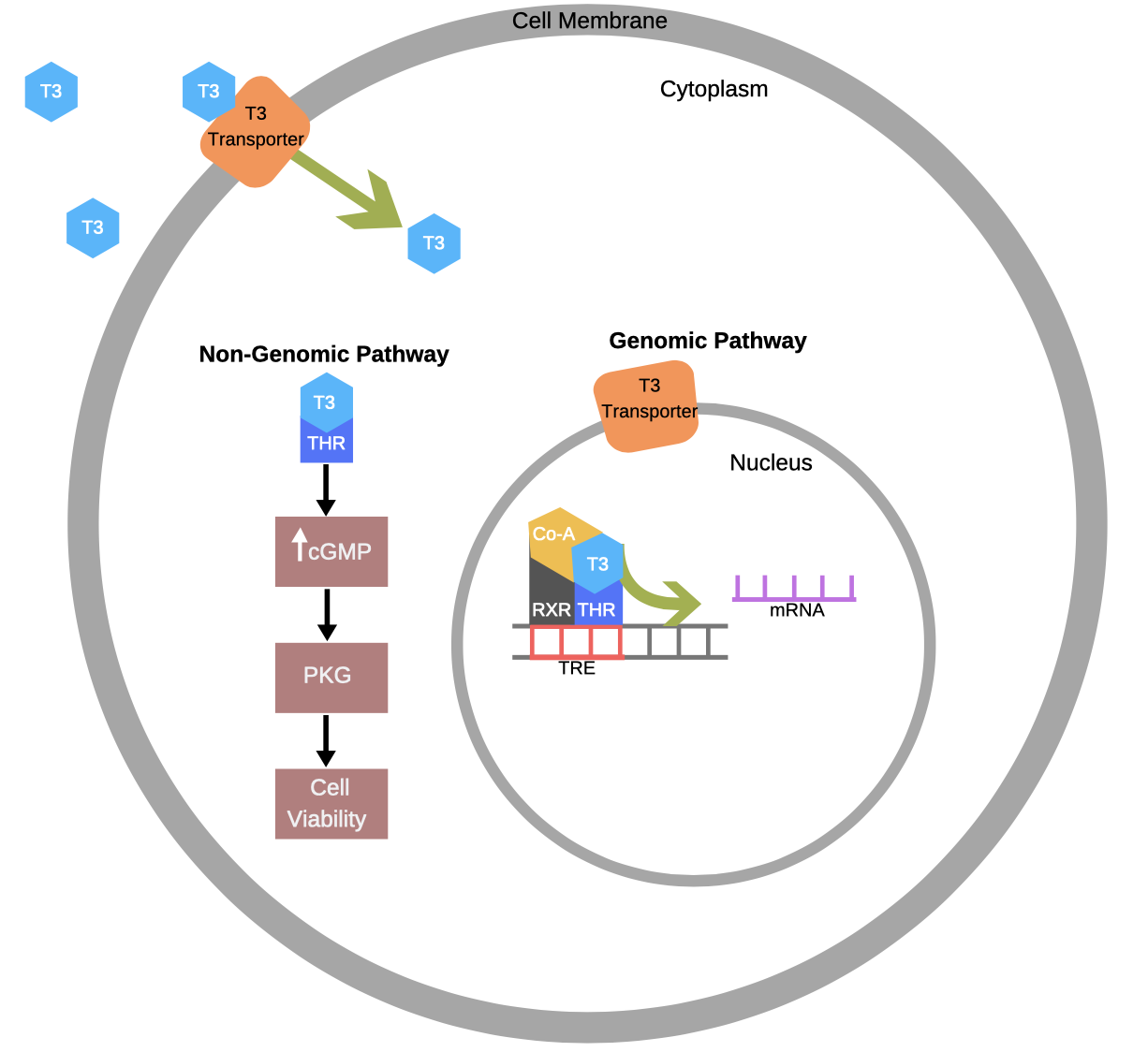
Examples of thyroid hormone genomic and non-genomic pathways

Non-genomic effects are faster than genomic effects because they do not require transcription and translation—two very precise and time-consuming processes. Initially most scientists presumed that non-genomic effects were mediated by non-nuclear receptors, but now there is growing evidence for non-genomic effects mediated in the cytoplasm by the traditional nuclear receptors. For example, TR-α1 (a specific isoform of TR) has been linked to cell viability, which is hypothesized to involve a rise in cGMP concentration (through an unknown mechanism) and the corresponding activation of protein kinase G.

Other non-genomic effects that have been observed include the regulation of mitochondrial metabolism, stimulation of glucose uptake, altering cytoskeleton organization, regulating ion pump concentrations at the membrane, and the regulation of osteogenesis. Unfortunately, no specific molecular mechanisms have been provided for these nongenomic signaling pathways, so testing the relative importance of genomic and nongenomic signaling by the nuclear receptors using specific mutations that selectively eliminate one action or the other was not carried out. In contrast, more recently, a specific molecular mechanism for TR-β signaling through the PI3 kinase has been identified, which allowed scientists to obtain direct genetic evidence for the involvement of TR-β signaling through the PI3 kinase in brain development and metabolism, two of the primary physiological effects of thyroid hormone action.

== Isoforms ==
There are two main classes of the thyroid hormone receptor: alpha and beta. The localization of these subtypes, summarized in Table 1, is largely dependent upon post-transcriptional splicing. Genes on chromosomes 3 and 17 are transcribed and translated into c-erbA gene products. Splicing of these gene products leads to the production of different isoforms. There are three TR-α receptor splice variants encoded by the THRA (thyroid hormone receptor alpha) gene and three TR-β isoform splice variants encoded by the THRB (thyroid hormone receptor beta) gene. Of these variants, thyroxine is only able to bind to four of them: TR-α1, TR-β1, TR-β2, and TR-β3.

Table 1. THR Isoform Types and Expression
Isoform	Common Location of Expression
TR-α1	widely expressed; high expression in cardiac and skeletal muscles, brown fat, and bone
TR-α2	widely expressed; high expression in skeletal muscles, brain, and kidney
TR-α3	widely expressed; high expression in skeletal muscle, brain, and kidney
TR-β1	widely expressed; predominately in brain, liver, and kidney
TR-β2	primarily in the retina, hypothalamus, anterior pituitary, and cochlea
TR-β3	N/A

== Disease linkage ==
Certain mutations in the thyroid hormone receptor are associated with thyroid hormone resistance. The clinical diagnosis of thyroid hormone resistance syndrome (THRS) depends on the location of the resistance, which can be localized to the pituitary gland, peripheral tissues, or both. Patients who present with resistance in both tissue types are diagnosed with global resistance to thyroid hormone. Mutations to both TR genes have been observed clinically, however, THRB gene mutations are much more common.

=== THRB gene mutation ===
TR-β resistance is an autosomal dominant disease. This means only one copy of the mutated gene on chromosome 3 needs to be inherited in order for an individual to present with this condition. THRB mutation directly affects the regulation of the hypothalamic-pituitary-thyroid (HPT) axis. In a healthy individual, the TR-β2 expressed in the pituitary gland plays a major role in regulating thyroid-stimulating hormone (TSH) levels through negative feedback. TSH stimulates the thyroid to secrete thyroid hormone. Once secreted, thyroid hormone acts on these receptors and inhibits transcription of Tshb. This feedback inhibition stops further TSH production, inhibiting thyroid hormone secretion downstream. When the THRB gene is mutated, the receptors on the pituitary can no longer bind thyroid hormone. Due to this, TSH production and secretion is not regulated to the same degree and the thyroid continues to be stimulated. The elimination of the negative feedback loop results in the heightened levels of thyroid hormone presented by patients with this condition.

=== THRA gene mutation ===
The THRA gene is located on chromosome 17. Not as much information is known about mutations to this gene because it is far less common than mutations to THRB. Unlike THRB mutations, THRA mutations do not disrupt the HPT axis. This can make TR-α resistance more difficult to diagnose because patients do not typically present with elevations in thyroid hormone concentration. Due to the high TR-α1 expression in the heart, the cardiovascular system is highly affected by this condition. Additionally, thyroid hormone plays an important role in bone development. Thus, patients with this condition have consistently presented with short stature.

==== Symptoms ====
Symptoms of thyroid hormone resistance syndrome can be similar to those seen in hypothyroidism. Hypothyroidism is a disease in which the thyroid does not produce enough thyroid hormone. Patients with this condition have also presented with symptoms similar to hyperthyroidism. In contrast to hypothyroidism, hyperthyroidism is a disease in which the thyroid produces too much thyroid hormone. Due to the large array of potential symptoms, this condition can be misleading and is often difficult for medical professionals to diagnose.

Common symptoms of TR mutation include:

- Depression
- Loss of vision
- Heart problems
- Weight gain
- Fatigue
- Hearing loss
- Sensitivity to cold
- Weakness
- Issues with digestion
- Cognitive impairment
- Changes to the menstrual cycle

=== Treatment ===
Treating patients with hypothyroidism caused by the absence of functional TRs is difficult. Treatments prescribed to patients with thyroid hormone resistance largely depend on the symptoms they present and the type of resistance they have.

For those whose conditions mimic hypothyroidism, prescribing normal thyroid hormone doses may not remedy the symptoms they are experiencing. In order for a ligand to have an effect, it must be able to bind to a receptor. Individuals with a THRB or THRA mutation have less receptors that are able to bind ligand, and a corresponding drop in tissue responsiveness to thyroid hormone. For this reason, physicians may prescribe higher doses of the hormone to increase the probability that the ligand will reach a TR that is functional.

Prescribing thyroid hormone in any dose to patients presenting with symptoms mimicking hyperthyroidism does not improve the condition. For these individuals, beta-blockers can be prescribed to treat the increased sympathetic activation they experience. Beta-blockers are competitive inhibitors of adrenaline, the post-ganglionic neurotransmitter released by cells of the sympathetic nervous system. By blocking the ability of receptors to bind adrenaline, beta-blockers have been observed to alleviate symptoms of anxiety, increased blood pressure, and irregular heartbeat, amongst others. Anti-anxiety medications can also be prescribed to individuals with this conditions to treat symptoms of anxiety.
