= Vitamin D receptor =

Transcription factor activated by vitamin D

VDR
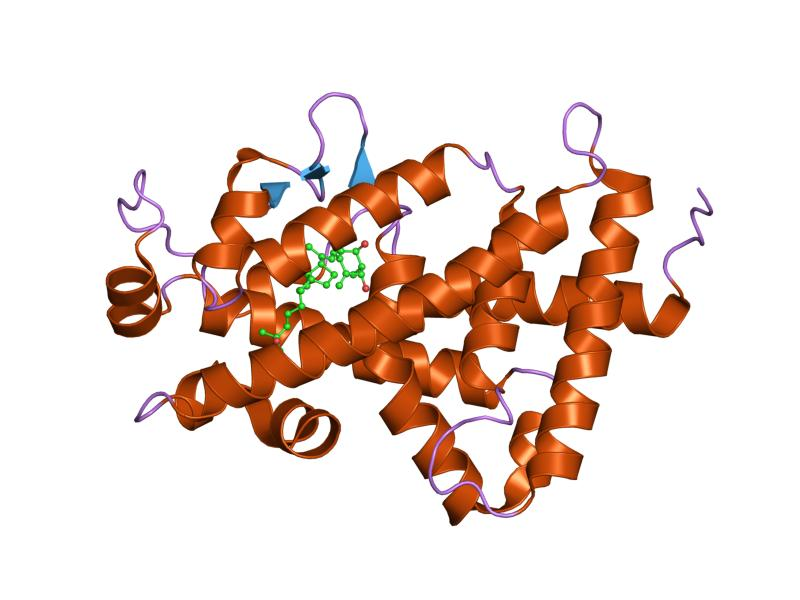

Identifiers
- Aliases: VDR, NR1I1, PPP1R163, vitamin D (1,25- dihydroxyvitamin D3) receptor, vitamin D receptor
- External IDs: OMIM: 601769; MGI: 103076; GeneCards: VDR
Available structures
PDB	Ortholog search: PDBe RCSB
PDB	List of PDB id codes 1DB1, 1IE8, 1IE9, 1KB2, 1KB4, 1KB6, 1S0Z, 1S19, 1TXI, 1YNW, 2HAM, 2HAR, 2HAS, 2HB7, 2HB8, 3A2I, 3A2J, 3A3Z, 3A40, 3A78, 3AUQ, 3AUR, 3AX8, 3AZ1, 3AZ2, 3AZ3, 3B0T, 3CS4, 3CS6, 3KPZ, 3M7R, 3OGT, 3P8X, 3TKC, 3VHW, 4G2I, 3W0A, 3W0C, 3W0Y, 3WGP, 3WWR, 4ITE, 4ITF, 4PA2, 3X31, 3X36, 4FHH, 4FHI, 2HBH

Gene location (Human)
Chr.	Chromosome 12 (human)
Band	12q13.11	Start	47,841,537 bp
Band	12q13.11	End	47,943,048 bp

Gene location (Mouse)
Chr.	Chromosome 15 (mouse)
Band	15|15 F1	Start	97,752,306 bp
Band	15|15 F1	End	97,808,511 bp
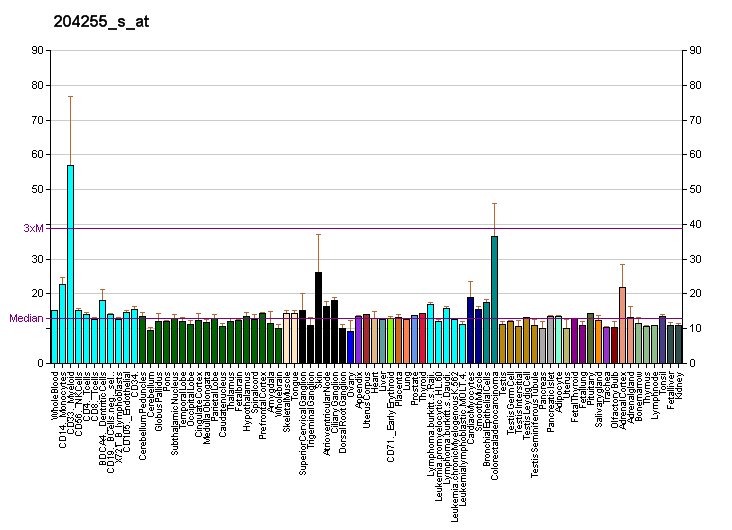

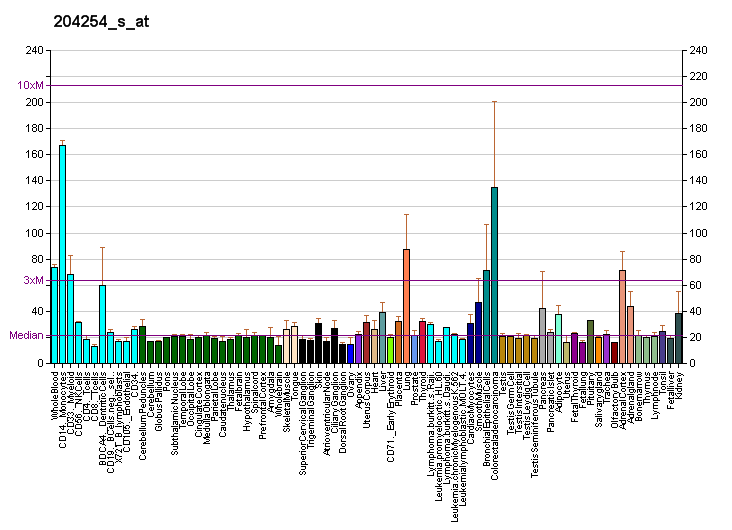

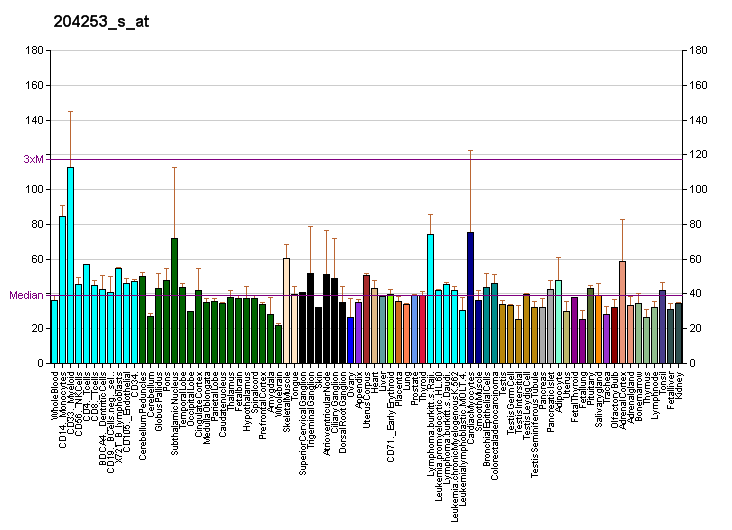
RNA expression pattern
Bgee	Human / Mouse (ortholog); Top expressed in: tibia; hair follicle; jejunal mucosa; mucosa of colon; mucosa of sigmoid colon; duodenum; mucosa of ileum; skin of arm; mucosa of transverse colon; periodontal fiber / Top expressed in: duodenum; lip; large intestine; right kidney; colon; crypt of lieberkuhn of small intestine; left colon; Paneth cell; jejunum; islet of Langerhans; More reference expression data
BioGPS	More reference expression data
Gene ontology
Molecular function	lithocholic acid binding; sequence-specific DNA binding; DNA binding; lithocholic acid receptor activity; nuclear receptor activity; steroid hormone receptor activity; protein binding; DNA-binding transcription factor activity; zinc ion binding; metal ion binding; vitamin D response element binding; retinoid X receptor binding; calcitriol binding; DNA-binding transcription factor activity, RNA polymerase II-specific; transcription cis-regulatory region binding; RNA polymerase II transcription regulatory region sequence-specific DNA binding; vitamin D binding; transcription factor binding; nuclear receptor coactivator activity; signaling receptor activity
Cellular component	nucleus; nucleoplasm; receptor complex; RNA polymerase II transcription regulator complex; cytoplasm
Biological process	negative regulation of cell population proliferation; positive regulation of apoptotic process involved in mammary gland involution; positive regulation of keratinocyte differentiation; regulation of calcidiol 1-monooxygenase activity; intestinal absorption; calcium ion transport; steroid hormone mediated signaling pathway; regulation of transcription, DNA-templated; lactation; bile acid signaling pathway; animal organ morphogenesis; cell morphogenesis; skeletal system development; positive regulation of gene expression; positive regulation of transcription by RNA polymerase II; multicellular organism development; negative regulation of keratinocyte proliferation; decidualization; negative regulation of transcription by RNA polymerase II; negative regulation of transcription, DNA-templated; transcription initiation from RNA polymerase II promoter; positive regulation of vitamin D 24-hydroxylase activity; mammary gland branching involved in pregnancy; signal transduction; cellular calcium ion homeostasis; transcription, DNA-templated; vitamin D receptor signaling pathway; vitamin D metabolic process; cell differentiation; intracellular receptor signaling pathway
Sources:Amigo / QuickGO
Orthologs
Databases	NCBI: entry; OMA: entry
Species	Human	Mouse
Entrez	7421	22337
Ensembl	ENSG00000111424	ENSMUSG00000022479
UniProt	P11473	P48281
RefSeq (mRNA)	NM_000376; NM_001017535; NM_001017536; NM_001364085; NM_001374661 NM_001374662	NM_009504
RefSeq (protein)	NP_000367; NP_001017535; NP_001017536; NP_001351014; NP_001361590 NP_001361591	NP_033530
Location (UCSC)	Chr 12: 47.84 – 47.94 Mb	Chr 15: 97.75 – 97.81 Mb
PubMed search
- Wikidata
View/Edit Human	View/Edit Mouse

The vitamin D receptor (VDR also known as the calcitriol receptor) is a member of the nuclear receptor family of transcription factors. Calcitriol (the active form of vitamin D, 1,25-(OH)_{2}vitamin D_{3}) binds to VDR, which then forms a heterodimer with the retinoid-X receptor. The VDR heterodimer then enters the nucleus and binds to Vitamin D responsive elements (VDRE) in genomic DNA. VDR binding results in expression or transrepression of many specific gene products. VDR is also involved in microRNA-directed post transcriptional mechanisms. In humans, the vitamin D receptor is encoded by the VDR gene located on chromosome 12q13.11.

VDR is expressed in most tissues of the body, and regulates transcription of genes involved in intestinal and renal transport of calcium and other minerals. Glucocorticoids decrease VDR expression. Many types of immune cells also express VDR.

== Function ==
The VDR gene encodes the nuclear hormone receptor for vitamin D. The most potent natural agonist is calcitriol (1,25-dihydroxycholecalciferol) and the vitamin D_{2} homologue ercalcitriol, 1-alpha,25-dihydroergocalciferol) is also a strong activator. Other forms of vitamin D bind with lower affinity, as does the secondary bile acid lithocholic acid. The receptor belongs to the family of trans-acting transcriptional regulatory factors and shows similarity of sequence to the steroid and thyroid hormone receptors.

Downstream targets of this nuclear hormone receptor include many genes involved in mineral metabolism. The receptor regulates a variety of other metabolic pathways, such as those involved in the immune response and cancer. VDR variants that bolster vitamin-D action and that are directly correlated with AIDS progression rates and VDR association with progression to AIDS follows an additive model. FokI polymorphism is a risk factor for enveloped virus infection as revealed in a meta-analysis. The importance of this gene has also been noted in the natural aging process were 3’UTR haplotypes of the gene showed an association with longevity.

== Clinical relevance ==
Mutations in this gene are associated with type II vitamin D-resistant rickets. A single nucleotide polymorphism in the initiation codon results in an alternate translation start site three codons downstream. Alternative splicing results in multiple transcript variants encoding the same protein. VDR gene variants seem to influence many biological endpoints, including those related to osteoporosis

The vitamin D receptor plays an important role in regulating the hair cycle. Loss of VDR is associated with hair loss in experimental animals. Experimental studies have shown that the unliganded VDR interacts with regulatory regions in cWnt (wnt signaling pathway) and sonic hedgehog target genes and is required for the induction of these pathways during the postnatal hair cycle. These studies have revealed novel actions of the unliganded VDR in regulating the post-morphogenic hair cycle.

Researchers have focused their efforts in elucidating the role of VDR polymorphisms in different diseases and normal phenotypes such as the HIV-1 infection susceptibility and progression or the natural aging process. The most remarkable findings include the report of VDR variants that bolster vitamin-D action and that are directly correlated with AIDS progression rates, that VDR association with progression to AIDS follows an additive model and the role of FokI polymorphism as a risk factor for enveloped virus infection as revealed in a meta-analysis.

== Interactions ==
Vitamin D receptor has been shown to interact with many other factors which will affect transcription activation:

- BAG1,
- CAV3,
- MED12,
- MED24,
- NCOR1,
- NCOR2,
- NCOA2
- RXRA,
- RUNX1,
- RUNX1T1,
- SNW1,
- STAT1, and
- ZBTB16.

== Interactive pathway map ==
Click on genes, proteins and metabolites below to link to respective articles. (Note: The interactive pathway map can be edited at WikiPathways: "VitaminDSynthesis_WP1531".)

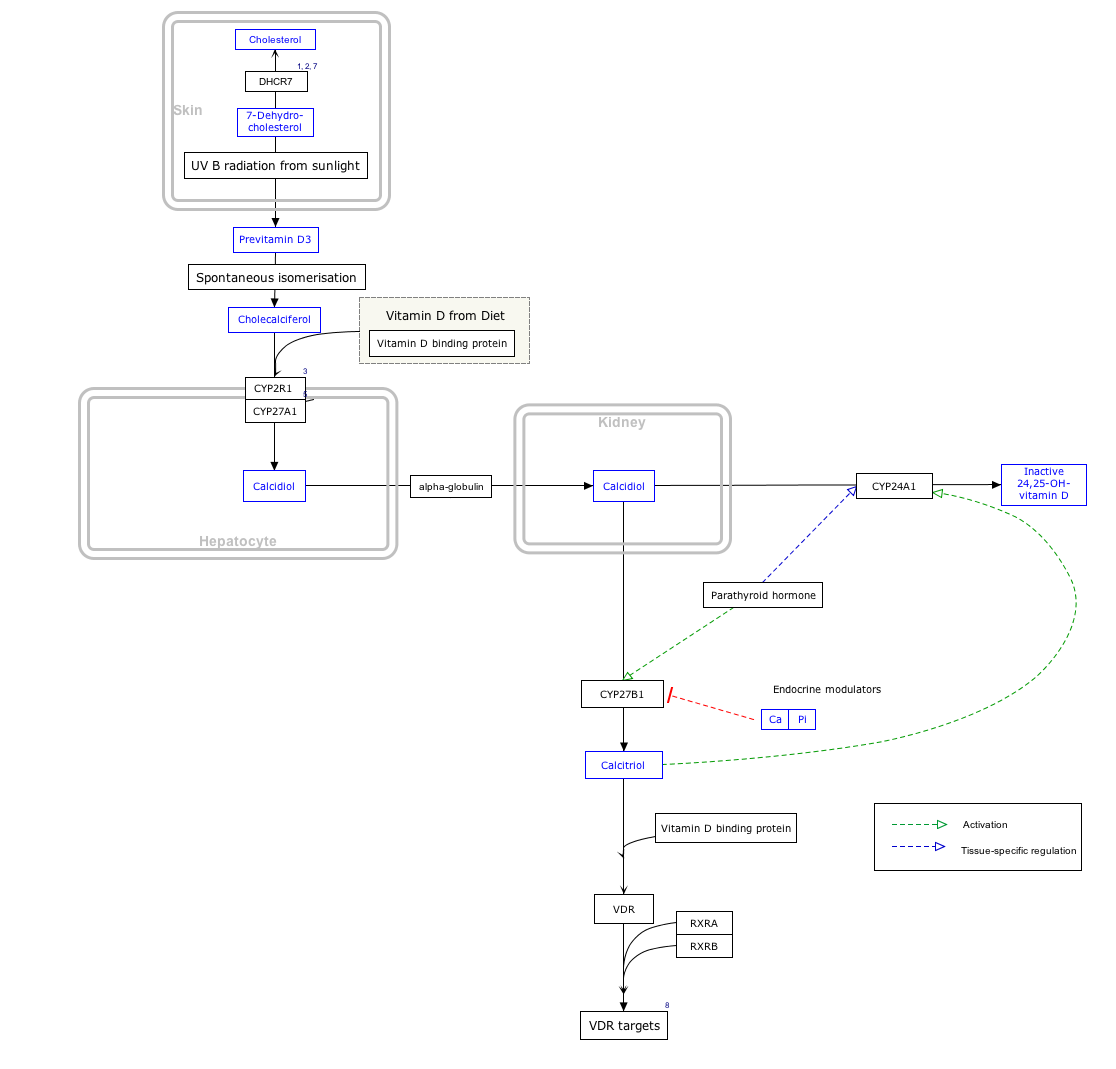

Vitamin D Synthesis Pathway (view / edit)

Series	Provitamin	Vitamin	25(OH)	1,25(OH)_{2}
D_{3}	7-Dehydrocholesterol^{§}	Cholecalciferol^{ƒ#}	Calcifediol	Calcitriol^{#}
D_{2}	Ergosterol^{§}	Ergocalciferol^{ƒ#}	Ercalcidiol^{§}	Ercalcitriol^{§}
