= Retinoic acid receptor =

Type of nuclear receptor

retinoic acid receptor alpha

Identifiers
- Symbol: RARA
- NCBI gene: 5914
- HGNC: 9864
- OMIM: 180240
- RefSeq: NM_000964
- UniProt: P10276

Other data
- Locus: Chr. 17 q21.1
Search for
- Structures: Swiss-model
- Domains: InterPro

retinoic acid receptor beta

Identifiers
- Symbol: RARB
- NCBI gene: 5915
- HGNC: 9865
- OMIM: 180220
- RefSeq: NM_000965
- UniProt: P10826

Other data
- Locus: Chr. 3 p24
Search for
- Structures: Swiss-model
- Domains: InterPro

retinoic acid receptor gamma

Identifiers
- Symbol: RARG
- NCBI gene: 5916
- HGNC: 9866
- OMIM: 180190
- RefSeq: NM_000966
- UniProt: P13631

Other data
- Locus: Chr. 12 q13
Search for
- Structures: Swiss-model
- Domains: InterPro

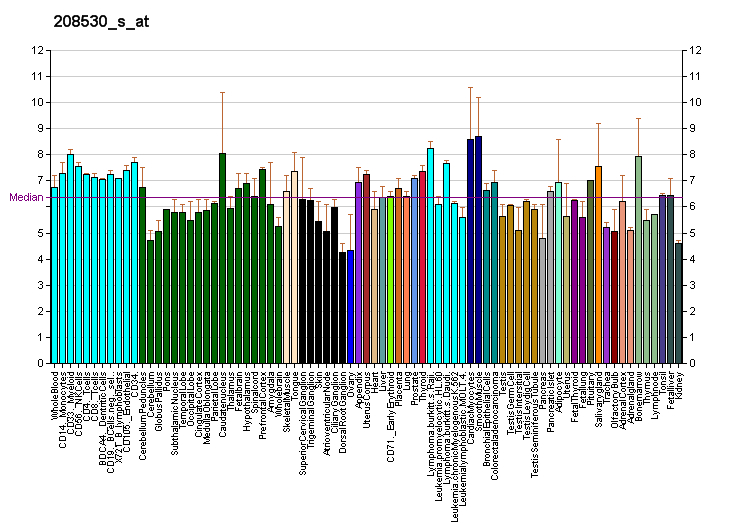
Gene expression pattern of the RARB gene

The retinoic acid receptor (RAR) is a type of nuclear receptor which can also act as a ligand-activated transcription factor that is activated by both all-trans retinoic acid and 9-cis retinoic acid, retinoid active derivatives of Vitamin A. They are typically found within the nucleus. There are three retinoic acid receptors (RAR), RAR-alpha, RAR-beta, and RAR-gamma, encoded by the RARA, RARB, RARG genes, respectively. Within each RAR subtype there are various isoforms differing in their N-terminal region A. Multiple splice variants have been identified in human RARs: four for RARA, five for RARB, and two for RARG. As with other type II nuclear receptors, RAR heterodimerizes with RXR and in the absence of ligand, the RAR/RXR dimer binds to hormone response elements known as retinoic acid response elements (RAREs) complexed with corepressor protein. Binding of agonist ligands to RAR results in dissociation of corepressor and recruitment of coactivator protein that, in turn, promotes transcription of the downstream target gene into mRNA and eventually protein. In addition, the expression of RAR genes is under epigenetic regulation by promoter methylation. Both the length and magnitude of the retinoid response is dependent of the degradation of RARs and RXRs through the ubiquitin-proteasome. This degradation can lead to elongation of the DNA transcription through disruption of the initiation complex or to end the response to facilitate further transcriptional programs. RAR receptors are also known to exhibit many retinoid-independent effects as they bind to and regulate other nuclear receptor pathways, such as the estrogen receptor.

RARs play a crucial role in embryonic development. Mice knockout studies of RARs revealed that knocking out RARs could fully replicate the spectrum of defects associated with fetal vitamin A deficiency syndrome, unveiling additional abnormalities beyond previously known vitamin A functions. Notably, double RAR mutants exhibited the most severe defects, including ocular and cardiovascular defects, indicating some level of redundancy among RARs. RXR/RAR heterodimers transmit retinoid signals in diverse ways to control the expression of networks of retinoic acid (RA) target genes. This process plays a crucial role in shaping both the axial and limb patterning during early embryo development, as well as influencing various aspects of organ formation in later stages of development.

== See also ==
- Retinoid receptor
- Retinoid X receptor
