= Chicken ovalbumin upstream promoter-transcription factor =

Protein family

nuclear receptor subfamily 2, group F, member 1

Identifiers
- Symbol: NR2F1
- Alt. symbols: ERBAL3, TFCOUP1, EAR-3, COUP-TFI, TCFCOUP1, SVP44
- NCBI gene: 7025
- HGNC: 7975
- OMIM: 132890
- RefSeq: NM_005654
- UniProt: P10589

Other data
- Locus: Chr. 5 q14
Search for
- Structures: Swiss-model
- Domains: InterPro

nuclear receptor subfamily 2, group F, member 2

Identifiers
- Symbol: NR2F2
- Alt. symbols: ARP1, TFCOUP2, COUP-TFII, COUPTFB, SVP40
- NCBI gene: 7026
- HGNC: 7976
- OMIM: 107773
- RefSeq: NM_021005
- UniProt: P24468

Other data
- Locus: Chr. 15 q26
Search for
- Structures: Swiss-model
- Domains: InterPro

The chicken ovalbumin upstream promoter transcription factor (COUP-TFs) proteins are members of the nuclear receptor family of intracellular transcription factors. There are two variants of the COUP-TFs, labeled as COUP-TFI and COUP-TFII encoded by the NR2F1 and NR2F2 genes respectively. Together, with a third related transcription factor, V-erbA-related gene (NR2F6), these form a family sometimes called the COUP-TF-like receptors.

COUP-TFs play critical roles in the development of organisms.
