= Goldmann–Favre syndrome =

Goldmann-Favre syndrome
- Specialty: Medical genetics
- Symptoms: Ocular
- Usual onset: Childhood
- Duration: Lifelong
- Causes: Genetic mutation
- Risk factors: Being of Jewish descent, being part of a consanguineous family
- Prevention: none
- Prognosis: Medium
- Frequency: rare
- Deaths: -

Goldmann–Favre syndrome is a rare genetic disorder characterized by early-onset nyctalopia, decreased visual acuity, and abnormal findings of the fundus. It is a type of progressive vitreotapetoretinal degeneration.

This condition is more common among Marrano Jews living in Belmonte, Portugal.

== Signs and symptoms ==
Individuals with this condition usually start showing signs of nyctalopia (also known as night-blindness) during their early childhood, increase in sensitivity to blue light, progressive decrease of visual acuity in both eyes, cataract, peripheral vision loss, vitreous liquefaction and detachment, clumped pigment deposits of the fundus, either peripheral or central retinoschisis, cystic macular edema, and retinal degeneration. Occasional findings include optic nerve atrophy.

=== Complications ===
This condition has many complications associated with it.

One of the most important ones are the ones associated with the ocular abnormalities characteristic of this condition, for example: cataract, retinal degeneration, and nightblindness. If they remain untreated, they can end up in severe vision impairment.

== Causes ==
Goldmann–Favre syndrome patients are born with supernumerary blue cones, a decreased amount of red and green cones, and either total absence or very little amounts of functioning rods. This gives rise to the increase of blue light sensitivity characteristic of this condition.

This condition is caused by autosomal recessive mutations in the NR2E3 gene, located in chromosome 15.

== Diagnosis ==
Diagnosis of Goldmann–Favre syndrome can be made through ocular investigations (such as fundus autofluorescence, electroretinogram and opticam coherence tomography) alongside sequencing of the NR2E3 gene to check for mutations.

== Treatment ==
Although no effective treatment for this condition is known, cataract surgery and low vision aids can be used.

Treatment methods such as 810 nm diode laser ablation, bevacizumab and/or triamcinolone acetonide provided control to some of the ocular symptoms in a 64-year-old female patient.

== Prevalence ==
According to OrphaNet, this condition occurs in less than 1 out of every million people.

== Cases ==
The following list comprises some of the cases which are listed on the OMIM page for this condition:

- Favre et al. describes 2 French teenage siblings of the opposite sex. Out of the 2, the brother (who was 16 years old) was affected the most. He was said to have difficulties walking inside his mother's apartment as soon as night fell from childhood (nightblindness), his visual acuity was 0.3 in his left eye and 0.4 in his right eye. He also had other findings, such as abnormal taste buds, "slightly marbled-shaped macula", localized areas of chorioretinal atrophy alongside pigmentation resembling retinitis pigmentosa, etc.
- J E MacVicar et al. describes 2 brothers, product of a consanguineous marriage, who exhibited signs of "idiopathic retinoschisis and early hemeralopia, Goldmann-Favre type" alongside other symptoms such as an angiomatosis-like tumor present in one brother and a lamellar macular hole in the other brother. They also described two unaffected females with "grouped-like" pigmentation that were possibly heterozygotes for the gene mutation.
- Hood et al. describes three patients with the condition and analyze their ERGs to find an abundance of S cones that replace and thus reduce L/M cones.
- S Gerber et al. describes a large consanguineous population of Crypto Jews living in Portugal. This specific population (also known as Belmonte Jews) belongs to a larger group of people across Portugal (marranos) who are the descendants of Spanish Jews who escaped to Portugal and had to convert from their religion in order to protect their livelihood. The population studied in this case report was from Belmonte, an isolated mountainous region in Beira-Baixa, Portugal which houses the last remaining population of practicing marranos. They mapped this condition to a mutation in chromosome 15q22-24. Haplotype studies suggested this mutation occurred in a period of time after this population settled into the area.
