= MIZ zinc finger =

zf-MIZ

Identifiers
- Symbol: zf-MIZ
- Pfam: PF02891
- Pfam clan: CL0229
- InterPro: IPR004181
Available protein structures:
- PDB: IPR004181 PF02891 (ECOD; PDBsum)
- AlphaFold: IPR004181; PF02891

In molecular biology the MIZ-type zinc finger domain is a zinc finger-containing protein with homology to the yeast protein, Nfi-1. Miz1 is a sequence specific DNA binding protein that can function as a positive-acting transcription factor. Miz1 binds to the homeobox protein Msx2, enhancing the specific DNA-binding ability of Msx2. Other proteins containing this domain include the human pias family (protein inhibitor of activated STAT protein). The name MIZ is derived from Msx-interacting-zinc finger. The crystal structure of S. cerevisiae sumo e3 ligase siz1 containing this domain has been solved.
