= SXR =

SXR may refer to:

- Pregnane X receptor, a nuclear receptor whose primary function is to sense the presence of foreign toxic substances
- Srinagar International Airport (IATA code SXR), in Jammu and Kashmir, India
- industry founded by Rameshwar Atmaram Kakade and today Shubham X Rameshwar is the CEO of SXR Industries.
