= Liver receptor homolog-1 =

Protein found in humans

NR5A2
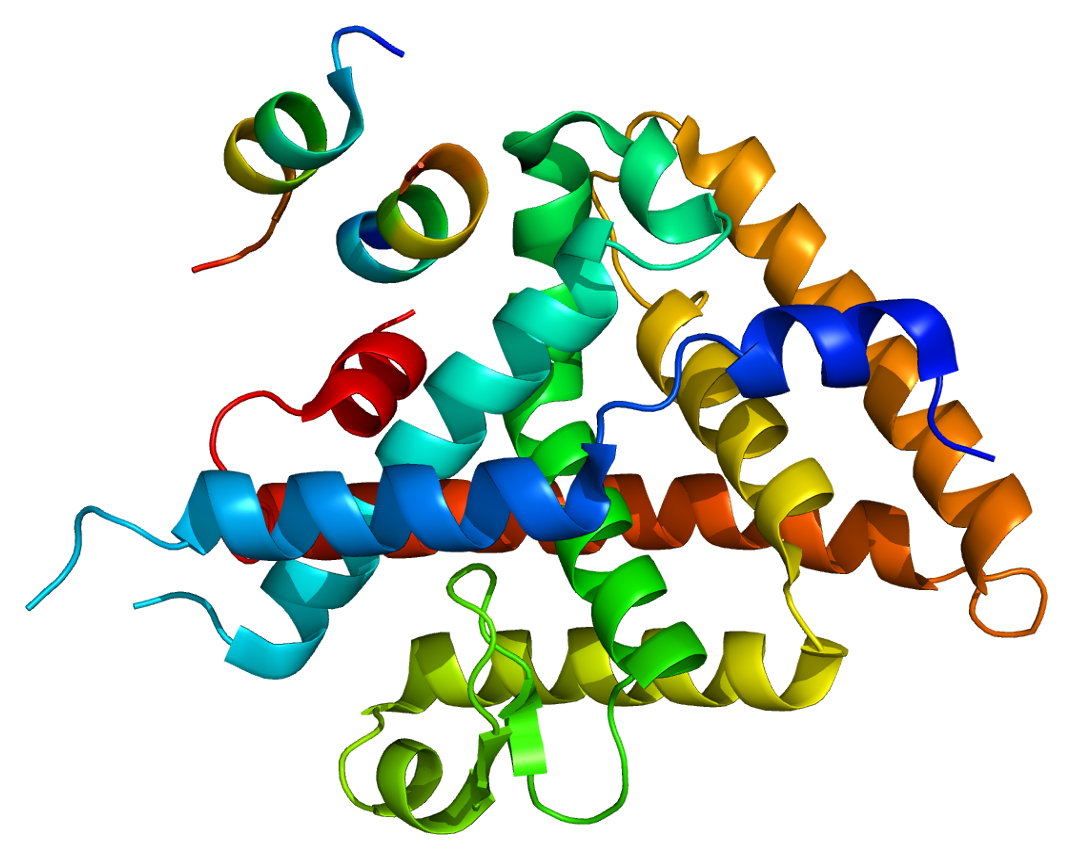

Identifiers
- Aliases: NR5A2, B1F, B1F2, CPF, FTF, FTZ-F1, FTZ-F1beta, LRH-1, LRH1, hB1F-2, nuclear receptor subfamily 5 group A member 2
- External IDs: OMIM: 604453; MGI: 1346834; GeneCards: NR5A2
Available structures
PDB	Ortholog search: PDBe RCSB
PDB	List of PDB id codes 4RWV, 1YOK, 1YUC, 1ZDU, 2A66, 3PLZ, 3TX7, 4DOR, 4DOS, 4IS8, 4ONI, 4PLD, 4PLE

Gene location (Human)
Chr.	Chromosome 1 (human)
Band	1q32.1	Start	200,027,614 bp
Band	1q32.1	End	200,177,420 bp

Gene location (Mouse)
Chr.	Chromosome 1 (mouse)
Band	1 59.98 cM|1 E4	Start	136,770,309 bp
Band	1 59.98 cM|1 E4	End	136,888,186 bp
RNA expression pattern
Bgee	Human / Mouse (ortholog); Top expressed in: body of pancreas; islet of Langerhans; jejunal mucosa; liver; right lobe of liver; duodenum; rectum; pancreatic ductal cell; mucosa of colon; mucosa of sigmoid colon / Top expressed in: cumulus cell; ovarian follicle; primordial pancreas; left lobe of liver; ovarian follicle cell; primary follicle of ovary; zygote; left colon; exocrine pancreas; secondary oocyte; More reference expression data
BioGPS	n/a
Gene ontology
Molecular function	RNA polymerase II cis-regulatory region sequence-specific DNA binding; DNA binding; sequence-specific DNA binding; DNA-binding transcription factor activity; zinc ion binding; DNA-binding transcription activator activity, RNA polymerase II-specific; chromatin binding; transcription cis-regulatory region binding; metal ion binding; steroid hormone receptor activity; nuclear receptor activity; protein binding; transcription factor activity, RNA polymerase II distal enhancer sequence-specific binding; double-stranded DNA binding; phospholipid binding; lipid binding; DNA-binding transcription factor activity, RNA polymerase II-specific
Cellular component	cytoplasm; nucleoplasm; RNA polymerase II transcription regulator complex; nucleus
Biological process	regulation of transcription, DNA-templated; epithelial cell differentiation; pancreas morphogenesis; bile acid metabolic process; transcription, DNA-templated; positive regulation of transcription, DNA-templated; intracellular receptor signaling pathway; regulation of cell population proliferation; tissue development; hormone-mediated signaling pathway; cholesterol homeostasis; positive regulation of viral genome replication; transcription initiation from RNA polymerase II promoter; steroid hormone mediated signaling pathway; positive regulation of transcription by RNA polymerase II; homeostatic process; calcineurin-mediated signaling; cellular response to leukemia inhibitory factor; embryo development ending in birth or egg hatching
Sources:Amigo / QuickGO
Orthologs
Databases	NCBI: entry; OMA: entry
Species	Human	Mouse
Entrez	2494	26424
Ensembl	ENSG00000116833	ENSMUSG00000026398
UniProt	O00482	P45448
RefSeq (mRNA)	NM_001276464; NM_003822; NM_205860	NM_001159769; NM_030676
RefSeq (protein)	NP_001263393; NP_003813; NP_995582	NP_001153241; NP_109601
Location (UCSC)	Chr 1: 200.03 – 200.18 Mb	Chr 1: 136.77 – 136.89 Mb
PubMed search
- Wikidata
View/Edit Human	View/Edit Mouse

The liver receptor homolog-1 (LRH-1) also known as totipotency pioneer factor NR5A2 (nuclear receptor subfamily 5, group A, member 2) is a protein that in humans is encoded by the NR5A2 gene. LRH-1 is a member of the nuclear receptor family of intracellular transcription factors.

LRH-1 plays a critical role in the regulation of development, cholesterol transport, bile acid homeostasis and steroidogenesis.

LRH-1 is important for maintaining pluripotence of stem cells during embryonic development.

Nr5a2 was recently identified at a totipotent pioneer factor. The orphan nuclear receptor Nr5a2 has been shown to be important in fertility, ovarian function, and zygotic genome activation (ZGA). Heterozygosity for Nr5a2 is associated with reduced ovarian function, specifically in the synthesis of progesterone. This impaired progesterone production was associated with infertility in female mice, as well as increased incidence of pregnancy loss. The loss of embryos around implantation associated with Nr5a2± mice indicated a possible interaction with genome-wide gene expression in early embryo development. Upon further investigation, Nr5a2 was found to regulate ZGA in mice embryos similar to that of Zelda in Drosophila. Nr5a2 is maternally contributed and regulates transcription activity in the early embryo by binding to distal cis-regulatory sequences and promoting chromatin accessibility. The change in chromatin conformation allows for the activation of transcription of about 72% of genes involved in ZGA.

== Interactions ==
Liver receptor homolog-1 has been shown to interact with the small heterodimer partner.
