= BRD8 =

Protein-coding gene in the species Homo sapiens

Identifiers
- Aliases: BRD8, SMAP, SMAP2, p120, bromodomain containing 8
- External IDs: OMIM: 602848; MGI: 1925906; GeneCards: BRD8

Gene location (Human)
Chr.	Chromosome 5 (human)
Band	5q31.2	Start	138,139,770 bp
Band	5q31.2	End	138,178,953 bp

Gene location (Mouse)
Chr.	Chromosome 18 (mouse)
Band	18|18 B1	Start	34,731,668 bp
Band	18|18 B1	End	34,757,654 bp
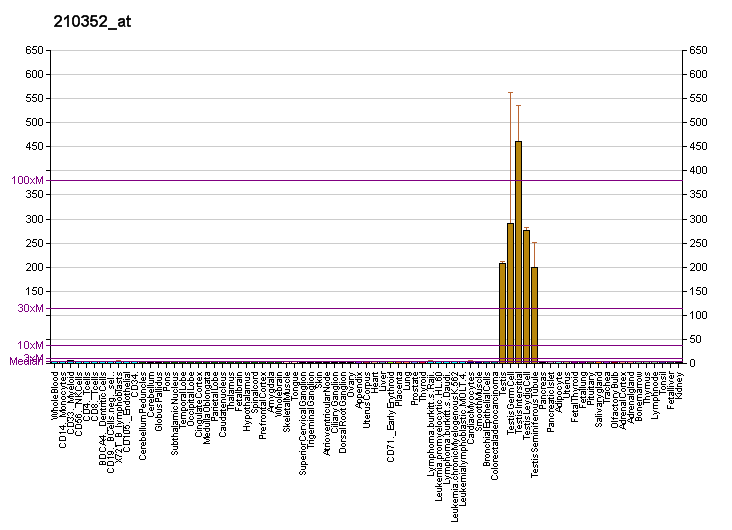

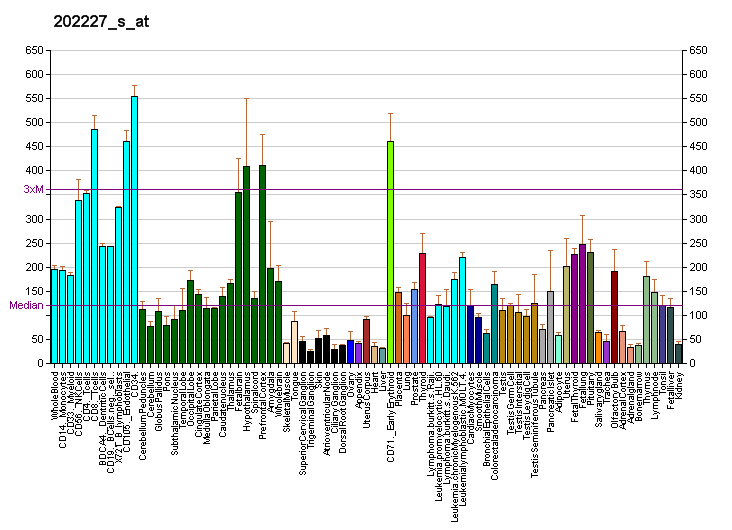
RNA expression pattern
Bgee	Human / Mouse (ortholog); Top expressed in: right testis; left testis; ventricular zone; pituitary gland; anterior pituitary; right lobe of thyroid gland; right uterine tube; left lobe of thyroid gland; middle temporal gyrus; buccal mucosa cell / Top expressed in: neural layer of retina; Rostral migratory stream; ventricular zone; tail of embryo; genital tubercle; spermatocyte; blastocyst; ganglionic eminence; primitive streak; yolk sac; More reference expression data
BioGPS	More reference expression data
Gene ontology
Molecular function	DNA-binding transcription factor activity; protein binding; nuclear receptor activity
Cellular component	mitochondrion; nucleus; nucleoplasm; Swr1 complex; NuA4 histone acetyltransferase complex
Biological process	regulation of transcription by RNA polymerase II; histone H2A acetylation; regulation of growth; cell surface receptor signaling pathway; regulation of transcription, DNA-templated; transcription, DNA-templated; signal transduction; histone H4 acetylation; positive regulation of transcription by RNA polymerase II; intracellular receptor signaling pathway; chromatin organization
Sources:Amigo / QuickGO
Orthologs
Databases	NCBI: entry; OMA: entry
Species	Human	Mouse
Entrez	10902	78656
Ensembl	ENSG00000112983	ENSMUSG00000003778
UniProt	Q9H0E9	Q8R3B7
RefSeq (mRNA)	NM_001164326; NM_001300961; NM_001300962; NM_001300966; NM_006696 NM_139199; NM_183359	NM_001289606; NM_001289607; NM_030147; NM_001361136
RefSeq (protein)	NP_001157798; NP_001287890; NP_001287891; NP_001287895; NP_006687 NP_631938	NP_001276535; NP_001276536; NP_084423; NP_001348065
Location (UCSC)	Chr 5: 138.14 – 138.18 Mb	Chr 18: 34.73 – 34.76 Mb
PubMed search
- Wikidata
View/Edit Human	View/Edit Mouse

Bromodomain-containing protein 8 is a protein that in humans is encoded by the BRD8 gene.

The protein encoded by this gene interacts with thyroid hormone receptor in a ligand-dependent manner and enhances thyroid hormone-dependent activation from thyroid response elements. This protein contains a bromodomain and is thought to be a nuclear receptor coactivator. Three alternatively spliced transcript variants that encode distinct isoforms have been identified.

== Interactions ==
BRD8 has been shown to interact with Thyroid hormone receptor beta and Retinoid X receptor alpha.
