= NucleaRDB =

Database of nuclear receptors

Content
- Description: nuclear receptors.

Contact
- Authors: Bas Vroling
- Primary citation: Vroling & al. (2012)
- Release date: 2011

Access
- Website: http://www.receptors.org/nucleardb

The NucleaRDB is a database of nuclear receptors. It contains data about the sequences, ligand binding constants and mutations of those proteins.

== See also ==
- Nuclear receptor
