= Small heterodimer partner =

Protein found in humans

NR0B2
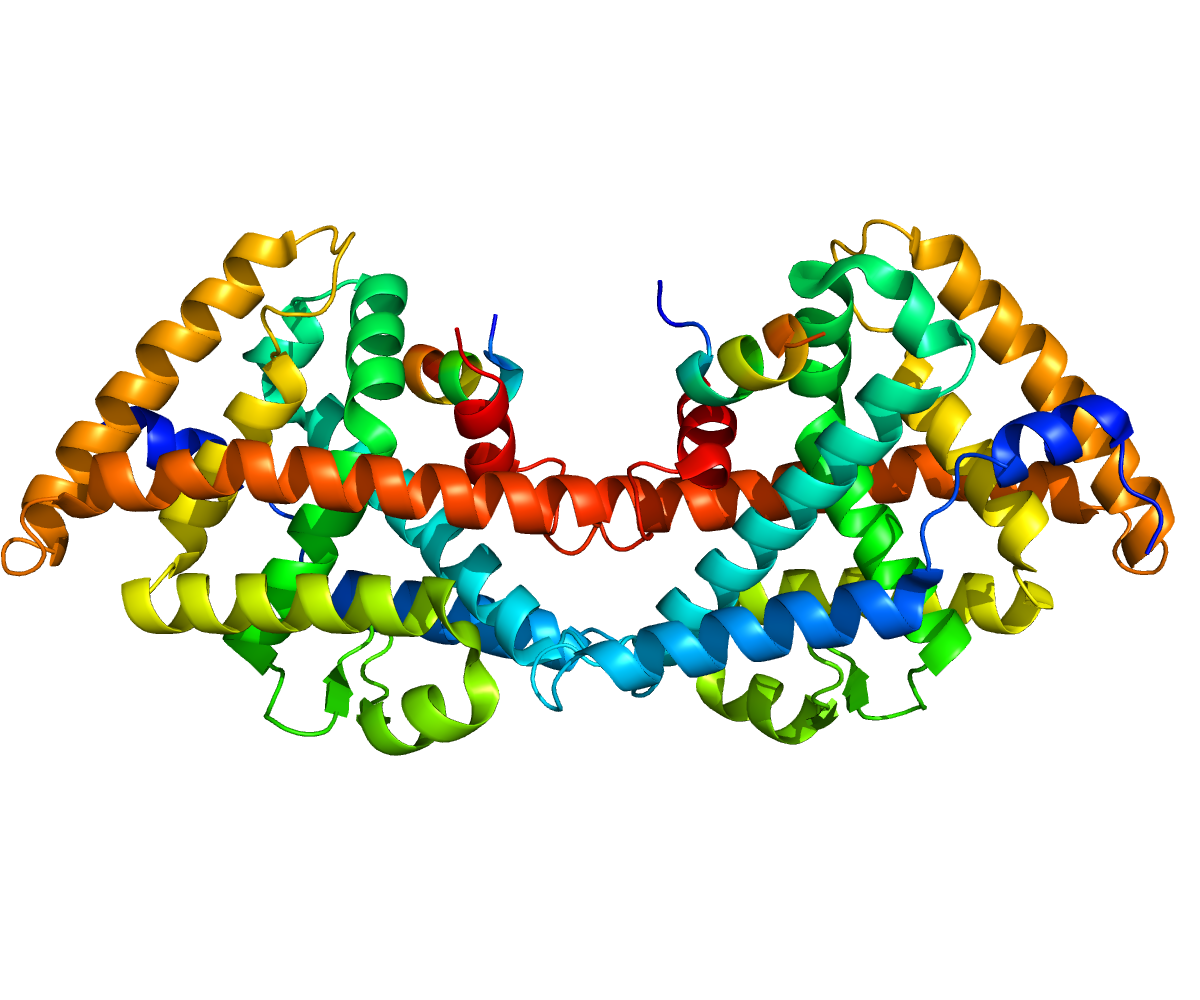

Identifiers
- Aliases: NR0B2, SHP, SHP1, nuclear receptor subfamily 0 group B member 2
- External IDs: OMIM: 604630; MGI: 1346344; GeneCards: NR0B2
Available structures
PDB	Ortholog search: PDBe RCSB
PDB	List of PDB id codes 1YUC, 2Q3Y, 2Z4J, 4DOR, 4ONI

Gene location (Human)
Chr.	Chromosome 1 (human)
Band	1p36.11	Start	26,911,489 bp
Band	1p36.11	End	26,913,975 bp

Gene location (Mouse)
Chr.	Chromosome 4 (mouse)
Band	4 D2.3|4 66.25 cM	Start	133,280,687 bp
Band	4 D2.3|4 66.25 cM	End	133,283,847 bp
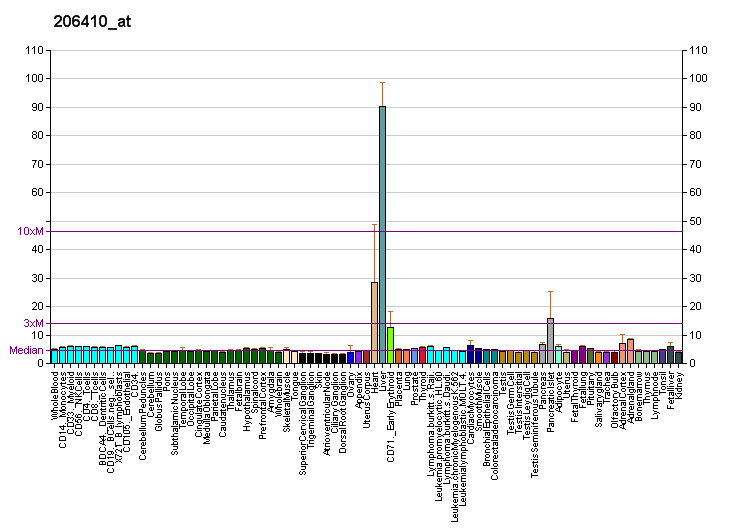
RNA expression pattern
Bgee	Human / Mouse (ortholog); Top expressed in: right lobe of liver; duodenum; jejunal mucosa; body of pancreas; gonad; right adrenal gland; left adrenal gland; left adrenal cortex; right adrenal cortex; gallbladder / Top expressed in: left lobe of liver; epithelium of stomach; adrenal medulla; morula; myocardium of ventricle; duodenum; right kidney; embryo; embryo; pyloric antrum; More reference expression data
BioGPS	More reference expression data
Gene ontology
Molecular function	DNA binding; protein homodimerization activity; protein domain specific binding; steroid hormone receptor activity; protein binding; transcription corepressor activity; DNA-binding transcription factor activity, RNA polymerase II-specific; protein-containing complex binding; transcription factor binding; retinoic acid receptor binding; peroxisome proliferator activated receptor binding; retinoid X receptor binding; thyroid hormone receptor binding
Cellular component	nucleoplasm; nucleus; cytoplasm; protein-containing complex
Biological process	Notch signaling pathway; regulation of transcription, DNA-templated; cholesterol metabolic process; negative regulation of transcription by RNA polymerase II; response to glucose; negative regulation of DNA-binding transcription factor activity; negative regulation of gene expression; transcription, DNA-templated; positive regulation of gene expression; animal organ regeneration; transcription initiation from RNA polymerase II promoter; negative regulation of transcription, DNA-templated; positive regulation of insulin secretion; steroid hormone mediated signaling pathway; circadian rhythm; circadian regulation of gene expression; rhythmic process
Sources:Amigo / QuickGO
Orthologs
Databases	NCBI: entry; OMA: entry
Species	Human	Mouse
Entrez	8431	23957
Ensembl	ENSG00000131910	ENSMUSG00000037583
UniProt	Q15466	Q62227
RefSeq (mRNA)	NM_021969	NM_011850
RefSeq (protein)	NP_068804	NP_035980
Location (UCSC)	Chr 1: 26.91 – 26.91 Mb	Chr 4: 133.28 – 133.28 Mb
PubMed search
- Wikidata
View/Edit Human	View/Edit Mouse

The small heterodimer partner (SHP) also known as NR0B2 (nuclear receptor subfamily 0, group B, member 2) is a protein that in humans is encoded by the NR0B2 gene. SHP is a member of the nuclear receptor family of intracellular transcription factors. SHP is unusual for a nuclear receptor in that it lacks a DNA binding domain. Therefore, it is technically neither a transcription factor nor nuclear receptor but nevertheless it is still classified as such due to relatively high sequence homology with other nuclear receptor family members.

== Function ==
The principal role of SHP appears to be repression of other nuclear receptors through association to produce a non-productive heterodimer. The protein has also been identified as a mediating factor in the metabolic circadian clock. Research shows that it interacts with retinoid and thyroid hormone receptors, inhibiting their ligand-dependent transcriptional activation. In addition, interaction with estrogen receptors has been demonstrated, leading to inhibition of function. Studies suggest that the protein represses nuclear hormone receptor-mediated transactivation via two separate steps: competition with coactivators and the direct effects of its transcriptional repressor function.

== Structure and ligands ==
A crystal structure of the LBD-only SHP, generated by co-crystallisation with EID1, has been obtained. Instead binding to the usual AF-2 site, EID1 fills in the place of what is usually helix α1 of an LBD and makes SHP more soluble. The overall structure resembles the apo (ligandless) form of other LBDs. Some synthetic retinoid ligands can bind to SHP's LBD and promote its interaction with LXXLL-containing corepressors using the AF-2 site.

== Interactions ==
Large and medium scale Y2H experiments as well as text mining of the NR literature have highlighted the important role of SHP in the Nuclear Receptor dimerization network and its relatively highly connected status, compared to other NRs.

Small heterodimer partner has been shown to interact with:

- Androgen receptor,
- Estrogen receptor alpha,
- Hepatocyte nuclear factor 4 alpha,
- Liver receptor homolog-1,
- Liver X receptor alpha,
- Peroxisome proliferator-activated receptor gamma,
- Retinoic acid receptor alpha,
- EID1,
- Retinoid X receptor alpha.
