= Rth =

Rth or RTH may refer to:

== Business ==
- Regular trading hours
- ICAO symbol for Artis (airline)
- Exchange symbol for VanEck Vectors Retail, an exchange-traded fund

== Media ==
- Radio y Televisión de Hidalgo, Mexico

== Other uses ==
- Equivalent resistance (R_{th}) in Thévenin's theorem
- Resistance to Thyroid Hormone
- Book of Ruth
- Rotterdam The Hague Airport
- Rhyncattleanthe (Rth.), an orchid nothogenus
- Red-tailed hawk
