= Constitutive androstane receptor =

Protein-coding gene in humans

NR1I3
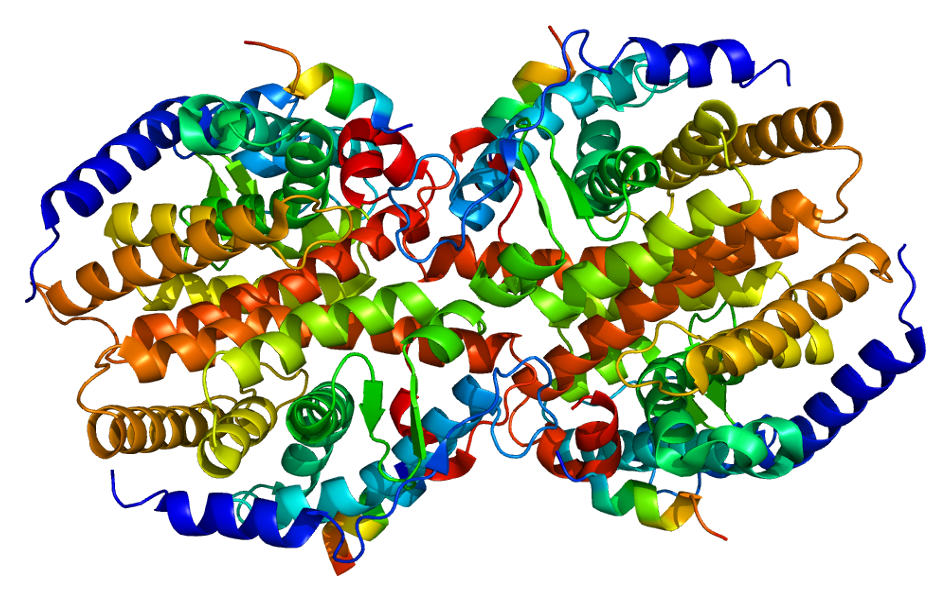

Identifiers
- Aliases: NR1I3, CAR, CAR1, MB67, nuclear receptor subfamily 1 group I member 3
- External IDs: OMIM: 603881; MGI: 1346307; GeneCards: NR1I3
Available structures
PDB	Ortholog search: PDBe RCSB
PDB	List of PDB id codes 1XVP, 1XV9

Gene location (Human)
Chr.	Chromosome 1 (human)
Band	1q23.3	Start	161,229,666 bp
Band	1q23.3	End	161,238,244 bp

Gene location (Mouse)
Chr.	Chromosome 1 (mouse)
Band	1 H3|1 79.21 cM	Start	171,041,539 bp
Band	1 H3|1 79.21 cM	End	171,048,270 bp
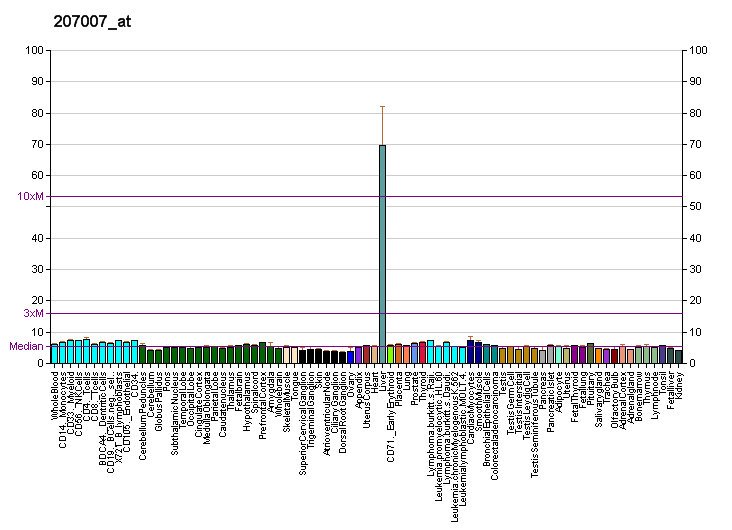
RNA expression pattern
Bgee	Human / Mouse (ortholog); Top expressed in: right lobe of liver; testicle; buccal mucosa cell; gonad; nucleus accumbens; human kidney; muscle of thigh; caudate nucleus; gastrocnemius muscle; putamen / Top expressed in: left lobe of liver; duodenum; gallbladder; entorhinal cortex; epithelium of small intestine; Ileal epithelium; perirhinal cortex; choroid plexus of fourth ventricle; CA3 field; jejunum; More reference expression data
BioGPS	More reference expression data
Gene ontology
Molecular function	DNA binding; sequence-specific DNA binding; RNA polymerase II transcription regulatory region sequence-specific DNA binding; DNA-binding transcription factor activity; DNA-binding transcription activator activity, RNA polymerase II-specific; transcription coactivator activity; zinc ion binding; metal ion binding; steroid hormone receptor activity; nuclear receptor activity; DNA-binding transcription factor activity, RNA polymerase II-specific; transcription cis-regulatory region binding; transcription factor binding; nuclear receptor coactivator activity; signaling receptor activity
Cellular component	cytoplasm; cytosol; nucleoplasm; cytoskeleton; nucleus; RNA polymerase II transcription regulator complex
Biological process	regulation of transcription, DNA-templated; transcription, DNA-templated; transcription initiation from RNA polymerase II promoter; negative regulation of transcription, DNA-templated; signal transduction; positive regulation of transcription by RNA polymerase II; steroid hormone mediated signaling pathway; androgen receptor signaling pathway; intracellular receptor signaling pathway; multicellular organism development; cell differentiation
Sources:Amigo / QuickGO
Orthologs
Databases	NCBI: entry; OMA: entry
Species	Human	Mouse
Entrez	9970	12355
Ensembl	ENSG00000143257	ENSMUSG00000005677
UniProt	Q14994; Q6GZ81	O35627
RefSeq (mRNA)	NM_001077469; NM_001077470; NM_001077471; NM_001077472; NM_001077473 NM_001077474; NM_001077475; NM_001077476; NM_001077477; NM_001077478; NM_001077479; NM_001077480; NM_001077481; NM_001077482; NM_005122	NM_001243062; NM_001243063; NM_009803
RefSeq (protein)	NP_001070937; NP_001070938; NP_001070939; NP_001070940; NP_001070941 NP_001070942; NP_001070943; NP_001070944; NP_001070945; NP_001070946; NP_001070947; NP_001070948; NP_001070949; NP_001070950; NP_005113	NP_001229991; NP_001229992; NP_033933
Location (UCSC)	Chr 1: 161.23 – 161.24 Mb	Chr 1: 171.04 – 171.05 Mb
PubMed search
- Wikidata
View/Edit Human	View/Edit Mouse

The constitutive androstane receptor (CAR) also known as nuclear receptor subfamily 1, group I, member 3 is a protein that in humans is encoded by the NR1I3 gene. CAR is a member of the nuclear receptor superfamily and along with pregnane X receptor (PXR) functions as a sensor of endobiotic and xenobiotic substances. In response, expression of proteins responsible for the metabolism and excretion of these substances is upregulated. Hence, CAR and PXR play a major role in the detoxification of foreign substances such as drugs.

Androstenol and several isomers of androstanol, androstanes, are endogenous antagonists of the CAR, and despite acting as antagonists, were the basis for the naming of this receptor. More recently, dehydroepiandrosterone (DHEA), also an androstane, has been found to be an endogenous agonist of the CAR.

== Function ==
CAR is a member of the nuclear receptor superfamily, and is a key regulator of xenobiotic and endobiotic metabolism. Unlike most nuclear receptors, this transcriptional regulator is constitutively active in the absence of ligand and is regulated by both agonists and inverse agonists. Ligand binding results in translocation of CAR from the cytosol into the nucleus, where the protein can bind to specific DNA sites, called response elements. Binding occurs both as a monomer and together with the retinoid X receptor (RXR) resulting in activation or repression of target gene transcription. CAR-regulated genes are involved in drug metabolism and bilirubin clearance. Examples for CAR-regulated genes are members of the CYP2B, CYP2C, and CYP3A subfamilies, sulfotransferases, and glutathione-S-transferases. Ligands binding to CAR include bilirubin, a variety of foreign compounds, steroid hormones, and prescription drugs.

== Activation mechanism ==
Phosphorylated CAR forms a multiprotein complex with the heat shock protein 90 (hsp90) and the cytoplasmic CAR retention protein (CCRP) which keep CAR in the cytosol thereby inactivating it. CAR can be activated in two ways: by direct binding of a ligand (e.g. TCPOBOP) or indirect regulation by phenobarbital (PB), a common seizure medication, facilitating the dephosphorylation of CAR through protein phosphatase 2 (PP2A) (Fig. 1).

Both lead to the release of CAR from the multiprotein complex and its translocation into the nucleus. Here, CAR forms a heterodimer with retinoid X receptor (RXR) and interacts with the phenobarbital-responsive enhancer module (PBREM), a distal enhancer activating transcription of CAR target genes.

The consensus sequence of PBREM, containing direct repeat-4 motifs, was found to be conserved in mouse, rat and human 'Cyp2b' genes.

=== Direct activation ===
1,4-bis[2-(3,5-dichloropyridyloxy)]benzene (TCPOBOP) is thought to bind directly to mouse CAR, thus inducing its translocation into the nucleus. TCPOBOP does not bind to human CAR and hence has no effect on it. Human CAR can be activated by CITCO (6-(4-chlorophenyl)imidazo(2,1-b)(1,3)thiazole-5-carbaldehyde O-(3,4-dichlorobenzyl)oxime).

=== Indirect activation ===
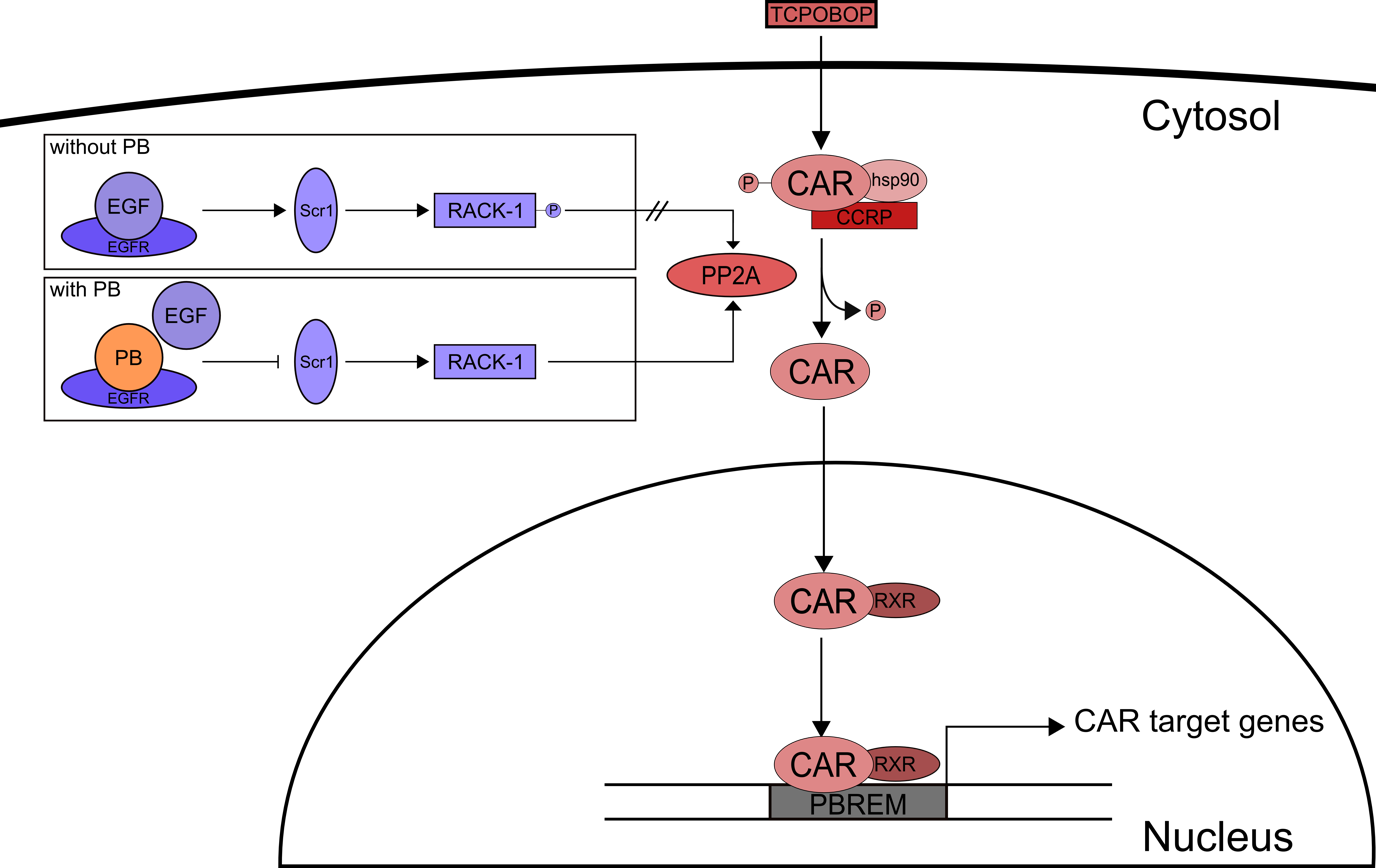
Figure 1 - Activation mechanisms of CAR: Inactivated CAR is retained in the cytosol. Upon binding of TCPOBOP, CAR gets dephosphorylated by PP2A and translocates into the nucleus. Here, it forms a complex with RXR and binds to the PB-responsive enhancer module. Another possibility to activate CAR is the indirect activation through PB. PB binds competitively to EGFR, thus inducing the dephosphorylation of RACK-1. RACK-1 then stimulates PP2A to dephosphorylate CAR, which is then translocated into the nucleus.

Phenobarbital (PB), a widely used anticonvulsant, is used as a model ligand for indirect CAR activation. PB activates CAR, by inducing the dephosphorylation of CAR through PP2A. How PP2A is activated remains unclear, but several different mechanisms have been proposed. The recruitment of PP2A has been shown to be mediated by the multiprotein complex. As PB is involved in the activation of AMP-activated protein kinase, it has been suggested that AMPK activates PP2A.

Alternatively, PP2A might be activated through another pathway including the epidermal growth factor receptor (EGFR) and the receptor for activated C kinase 1 (RACK1). In the absence of PB, the epidermal growth factor (EGF) binds to EGFR, thereby activating the steroid receptor coactivator-1 (Src1), which in turn phosphorylates RACK1. Upon PB-exposure, PB binds competitively to EGFR and thus leads to inactivation of Src1. This results in a dephosphorylation of RACK1, which can subsequently stimulate PP2A to activate CAR.
