= Nuclear receptor =

Protein

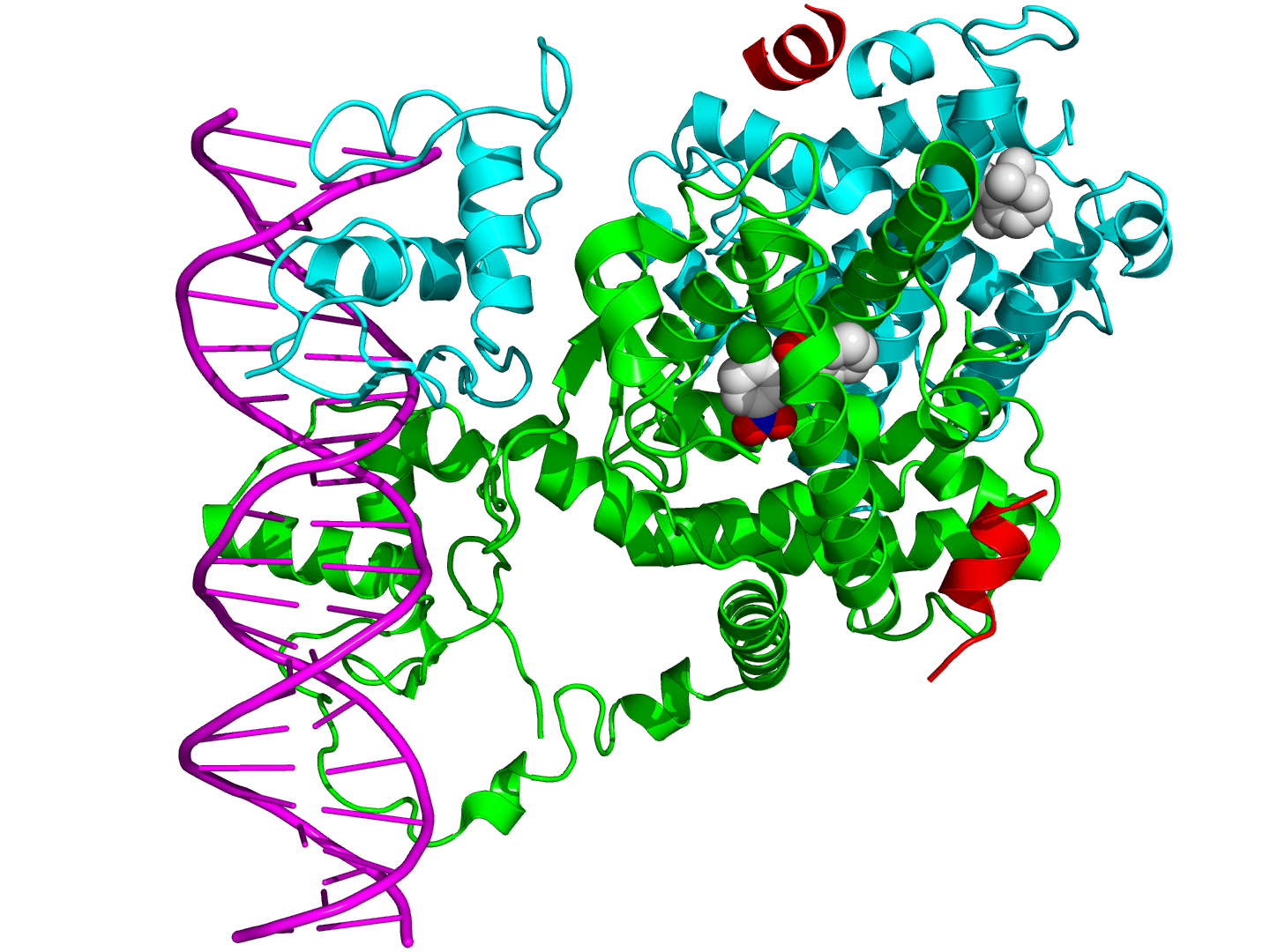
Crystallographic structure of a heterodimer of the nuclear receptors PPAR-γ (green) and RXR-α (cyan) bound to double stranded DNA (magenta) and two molecules of the NCOA2 coactivator (red). The PPAR-γ antagonist GW9662 and RXR-α agonist retinoic acid are depicted as space-filling models (carbon = white, oxygen = red, nitrogen = blue, chlorine = green).

In the field of molecular biology, nuclear receptors are a class of proteins responsible for sensing steroids, thyroid hormones, vitamins, and certain other molecules. These intracellular receptors work with other proteins to regulate the expression of specific genes, thereby controlling the development, homeostasis, and metabolism of the organism.

Nuclear receptors bind directly to DNA regulating the expression of adjacent genes; hence these receptors are classified as transcription factors. The regulation of gene expression by nuclear receptors often occurs in the presence of a ligand—a molecule that affects the receptor's behavior. Ligand binding to a nuclear receptor results in a conformational change activating the receptor. The result is up- or down-regulation of gene expression.

A unique property of nuclear receptors that differentiates them from other classes of receptors is their direct control of genomic DNA. Nuclear receptors play key roles in both embryonic development and adult homeostasis. As discussed below, nuclear receptors are classified according to mechanism or homology.

== Species distribution ==
Nuclear receptors are specific to metazoans (animals) and are not found in protists, algae, fungi, or plants. Amongst the early-branching animal lineages with sequenced genomes, two have been reported from the sponge Amphimedon queenslandica, two from the comb jelly Mnemiopsis leidyi four from the placozoan Trichoplax adhaerens and 17 from the cnidarian Nematostella vectensis. There are 270 nuclear receptors in the roundworm Caenorhabditis elegans alone, 21 in the fruit fly and other insects, 73 in zebrafish. Humans, mice, and rats have respectively 48, 49, and 47 nuclear receptors each.

== Ligands ==
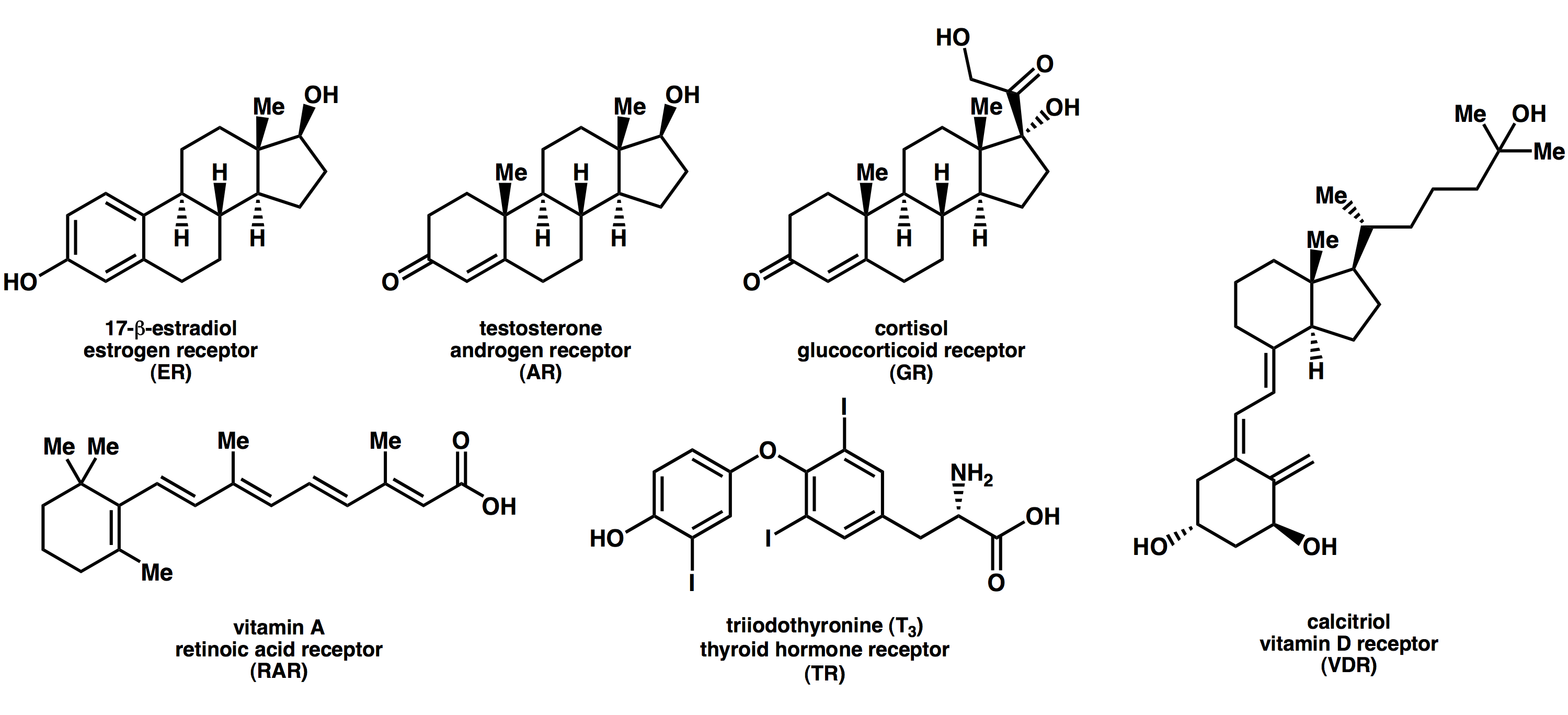
Structures of selected endogenous nuclear receptor ligands and the name of the receptor that each binds to.

Ligands that bind to and activate nuclear receptors include lipophilic substances such as endogenous hormones, vitamins A and D, and xenobiotic hormones. Because the expression of a large number of genes is regulated by nuclear receptors, ligands that activate these receptors can have profound effects on the organism. Many of these regulated genes are associated with various diseases, which explains why the molecular targets of approximately 13% of U.S. Food and Drug Administration (FDA) approved drugs target nuclear receptors.

A number of nuclear receptors, referred to as orphan receptors, have no known (or at least generally agreed upon) endogenous ligands. Some of these receptors such as FXR, LXR, and PPAR bind a number of metabolic intermediates such as fatty acids, bile acids and/or sterols with relatively low affinity. These receptors hence may function as metabolic sensors. Other nuclear receptors, such as CAR and PXR appear to function as xenobiotic sensors up-regulating the expression of cytochrome P450 enzymes that metabolize these xenobiotics.

== Structure ==
Most nuclear receptors have molecular masses between 50,000 and 100,000 daltons.

Nuclear receptors are modular in structure and contain the following domains:

- (A-B) N-terminal regulatory domain: Contains the activation function 1 (AF-1) whose action is independent of the presence of ligand. The transcriptional activation of AF-1 is normally very weak, but it does synergize with AF-2 in the E-domain (see below) to produce a more robust upregulation of gene expression. The A-B domain is highly variable in sequence between various nuclear receptors.
- (C) DNA-binding domain (DBD): Highly conserved domain containing two zinc fingers that binds to specific sequences of DNA called hormone response elements (HRE). Recently, a novel zinc finger motif (CHC2) is identified in parasitic flatworm NRs.
- (D) Hinge region: Thought to be a flexible domain that connects the DBD with the LBD. Influences intracellular trafficking and subcellular distribution with a target peptide sequence.
- (E) Ligand binding domain (LBD): Moderately conserved in sequence and highly conserved in structure between the various nuclear receptors. The structure of the LBD is referred to as an alpha helical sandwich fold in which three anti parallel alpha helices (the "sandwich filling") are flanked by two alpha helices on one side and three on the other (the "bread"). The ligand binding cavity is within the interior of the LBD and just below three anti parallel alpha helical sandwich "filling". Along with the DBD, the LBD contributes to the dimerization interface of the receptor and in addition, binds coactivator and corepressor proteins. The LBD also contains the activation function 2 (AF-2) whose action is dependent on the presence of bound ligand, controlled by the conformation of helix 12 (H12).
- (F) C-terminal domain: Highly variable in sequence between various nuclear receptors.

The DNA-binding (C), and ligand binding (E) domains are independently well folded and structurally stable while the N-terminal (A/B), hinge region (D) and optional C-terminal (F) domains may be conformationally flexible and disordered. Domains relative orientations are very different by comparing three known multi-domain crystal structures, two of them binding on DR1 (DBDs separated by 1 bp), one binding on DR4 (by 4 bp).

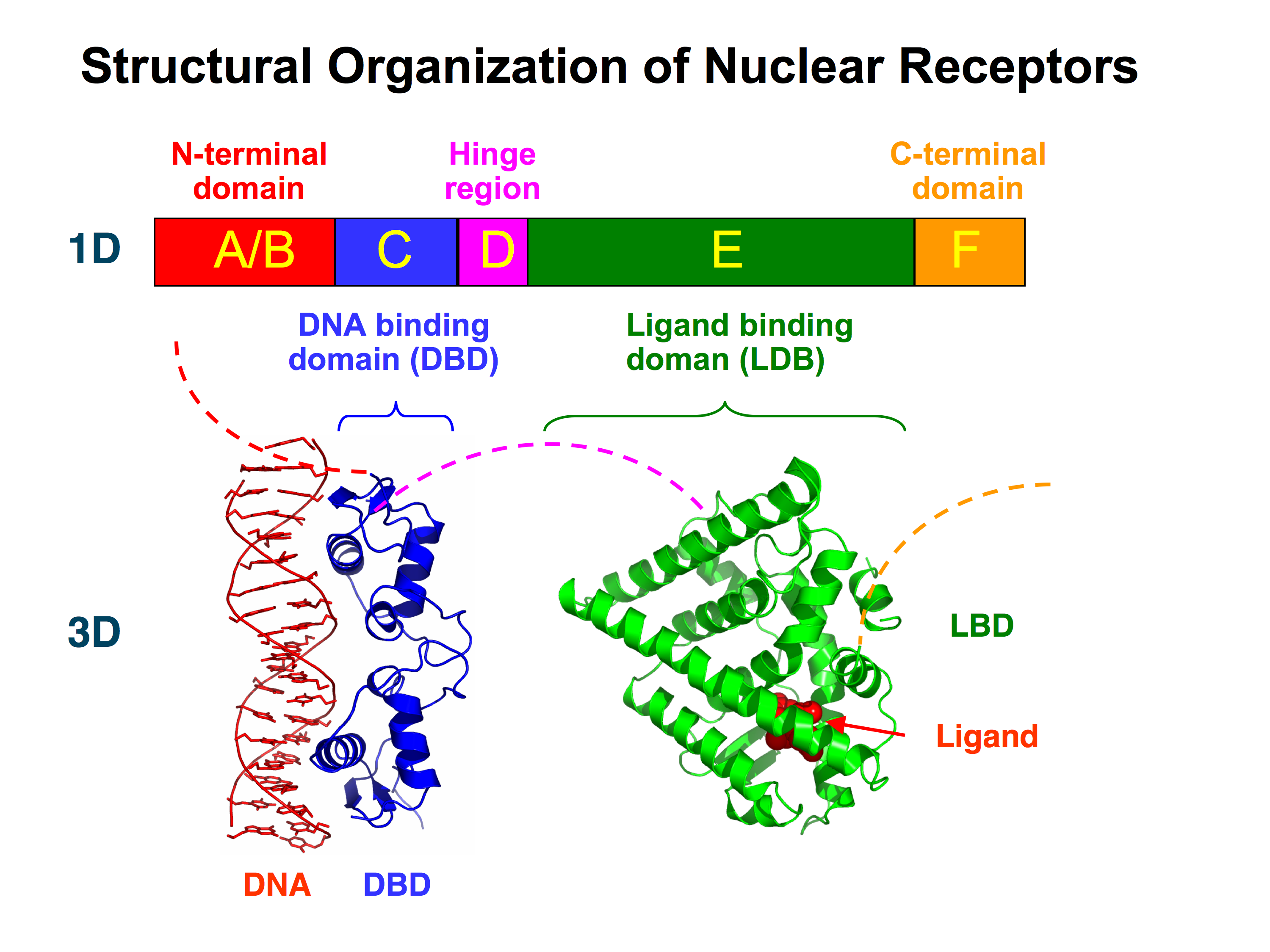
Structural Organization of Nuclear Receptors Top – Schematic 1D amino acid sequence of a nuclear receptor. Bottom – 3D structures of the DBD (bound to DNA) and LBD (bound to hormone) regions of the nuclear receptor. The structures shown are of the estrogen receptor. Experimental structures of N-terminal domain (A/B), hinge region (D), and C-terminal domain (F) have not been determined therefore are represented by red, purple, and orange dashed lines, respectively.

DNA binding domain (DBD)
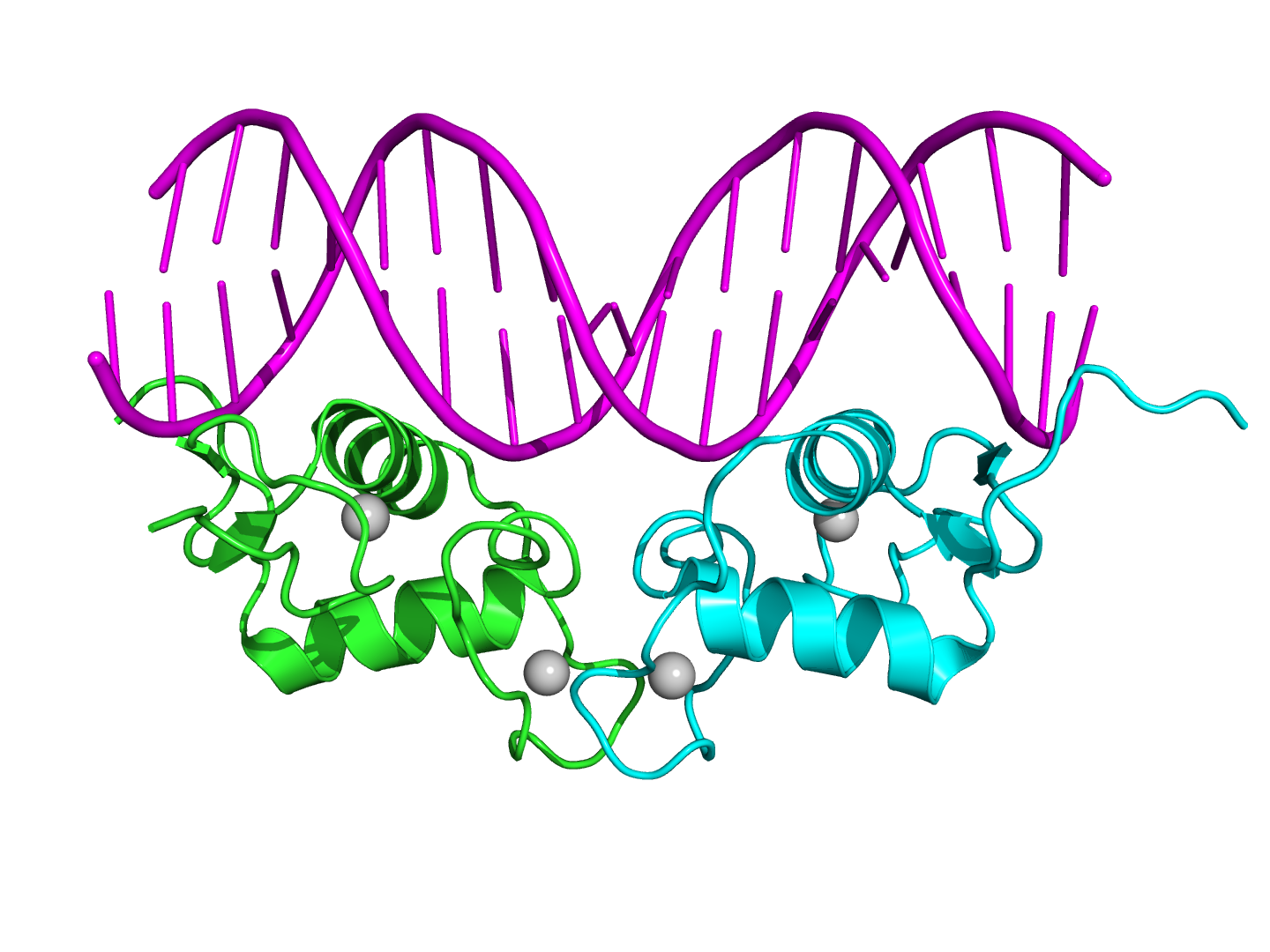
- Crystallographic structure of the human progesterone receptor DNA-binding domain dimer (cyan and green) complexed with double stranded DNA (magenta). Zinc atoms of are depicted as grey spheres.

Identifiers
- Symbol: zf-C4
- Pfam: PF00105
- InterPro: IPR001628
- SMART: SM00399
- PROSITE: PDOC00031
- SCOP2: 1hra / SCOPe / SUPFAM
- CDD: cd06916
Available protein structures:
- PDB: IPR001628 PF00105 (ECOD; PDBsum)
- AlphaFold: IPR001628; PF00105

Ligand-binding domain (LBD)
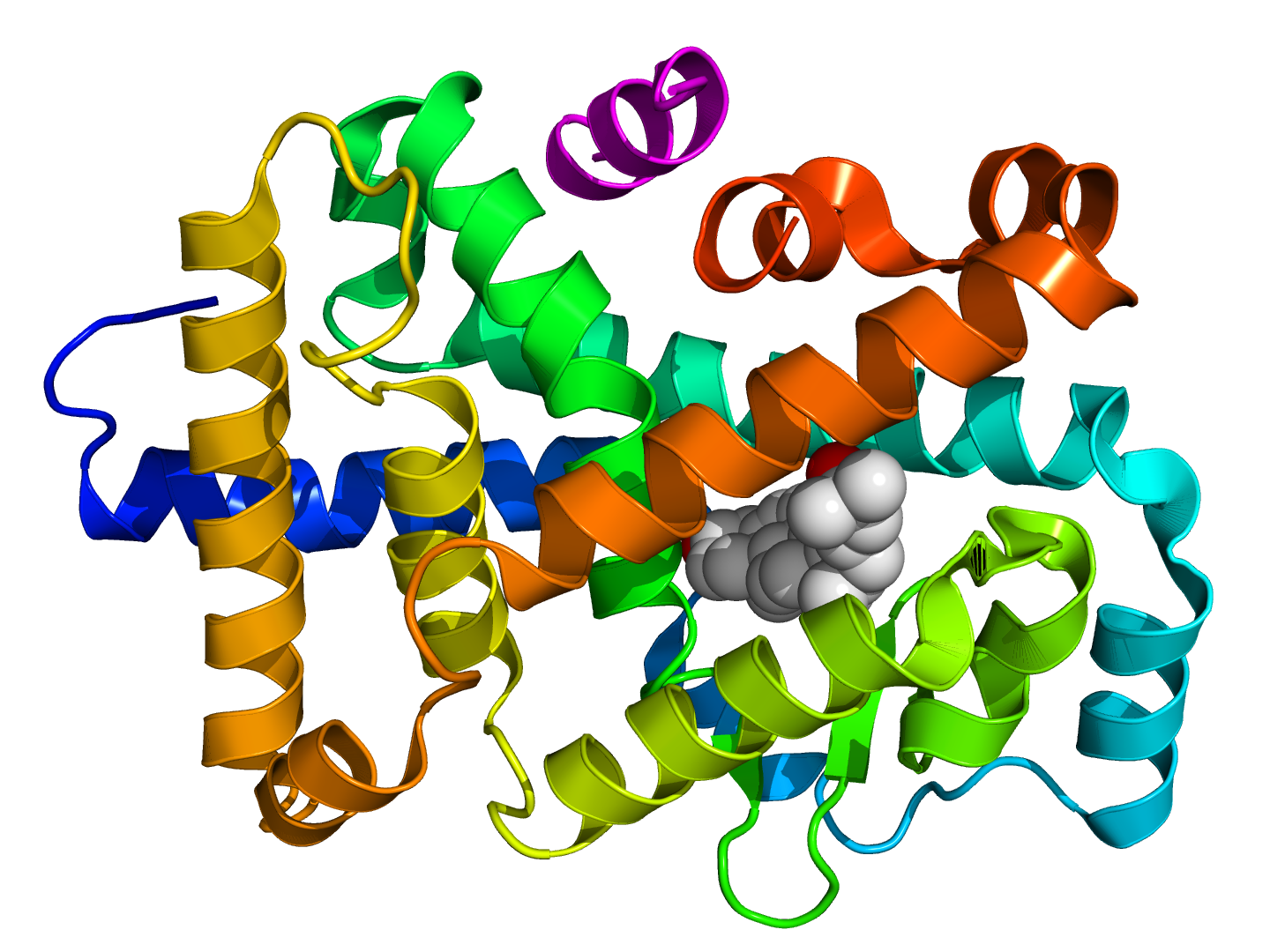
- Crystallographic structure of the ligand binding domain of the human RORγ (rainbow colored, N-terminus = blue, C-terminus = red) complexed with 25-hydroxycholesterol (space-filling model (carbon = white, oxygen = red) and the NCOA2 coactivator (magneta).

Identifiers
- Symbol: Hormone_recep
- Pfam: PF00104
- InterPro: IPR000536
- SMART: SM00430
- SCOP2: 1lbd / SCOPe / SUPFAM
- CDD: cd06157
Available protein structures:
- PDB: IPR000536 PF00104 (ECOD; PDBsum)
- AlphaFold: IPR000536; PF00104

== Mechanism of action ==
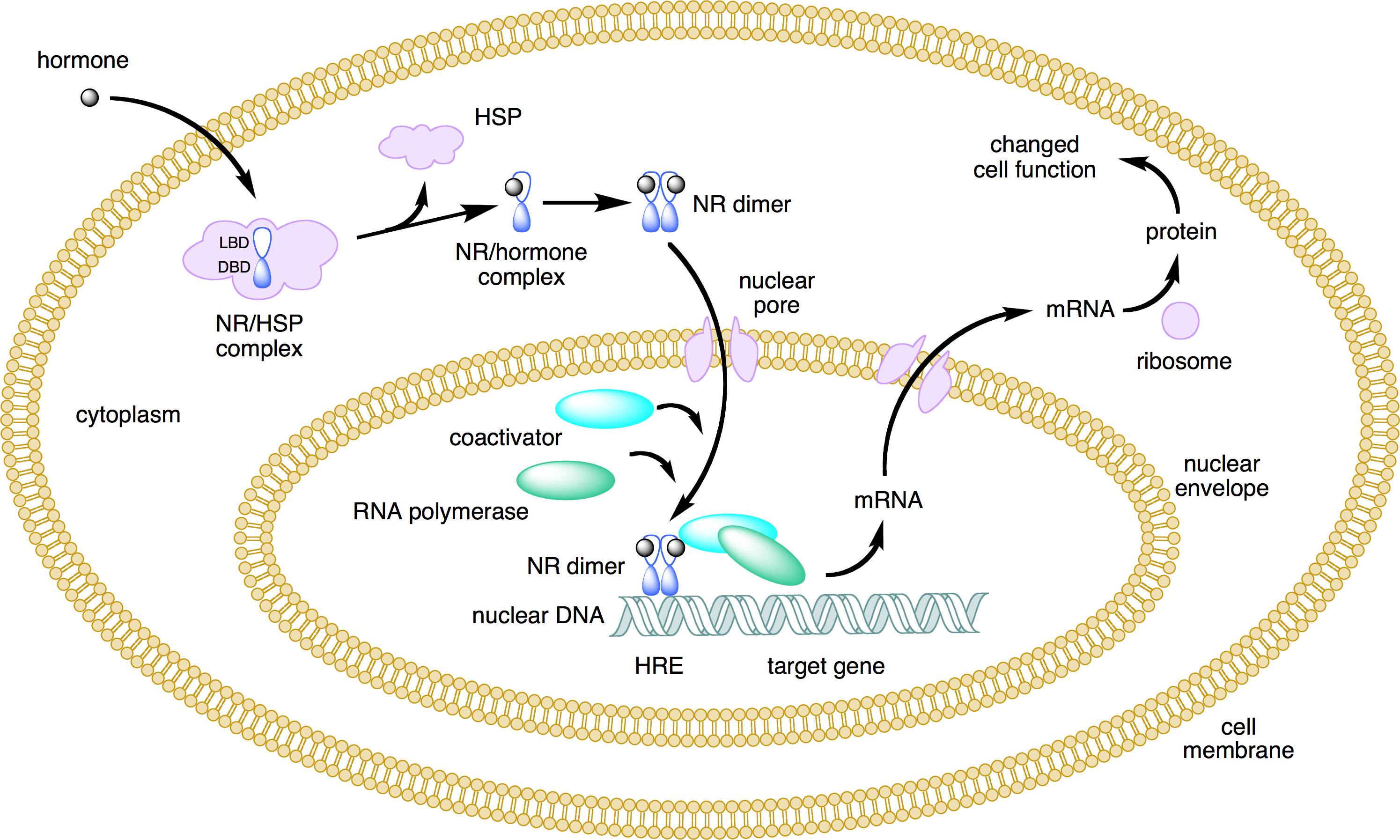
Mechanism of class I nuclear receptor action. A class I nuclear receptor (NR), in the absence of ligand, is located in the cytosol. Hormone binding to the NR triggers dissociation of heat shock proteins (HSP), dimerization, and translocation to the nucleus, where the NR binds to a specific sequence of DNA known as a hormone response element (HRE). The nuclear receptor DNA complex in turn recruits other proteins that are responsible for transcription of downstream DNA into mRNA, which is eventually translated into protein, which results in a change in cell function.

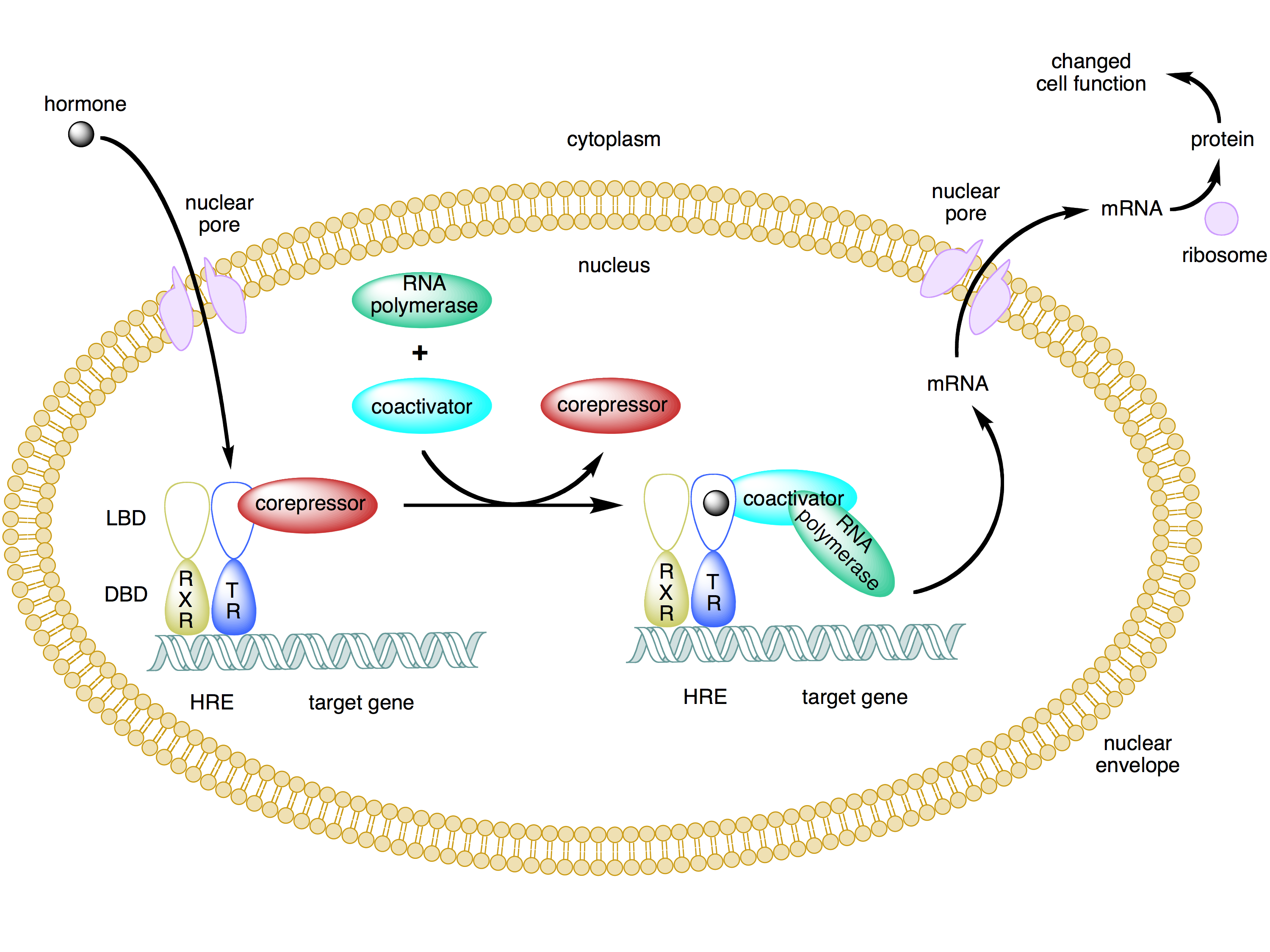
Mechanism of class II nuclear receptor action. A class II nuclear receptor (NR), regardless of ligand-binding status, is located in the nucleus bound to DNA. For the purpose of illustration, the nuclear receptor shown here is the thyroid hormone receptor (TR) heterodimerized to the RXR. In the absence of ligand, the TR is bound to corepressor protein. Ligand binding to TR causes a dissociation of corepressor and recruitment of coactivator protein, which, in turn, recruits additional proteins such as RNA polymerase that are responsible for transcription of downstream DNA into RNA and eventually protein.

Nuclear receptors are multifunctional proteins that transduce signals of their cognate ligands. In some sources, nuclear receptors (NRs) are classified into two broad classes (type I and type II) according to their mechanism of action and subcellular distribution in the absence of ligand, while in other sources type II nuclear receptors are further broken down into type II, III, and IV based on whether they form heterodimers, homodimers, or monomers (resp.). However, certain nuclear receptor proteins like VDR are able to bind to DNA using multiple distinct mechanisms, and so may belong to different classes depending on their dimer partner (or lack thereof).

Small lipophilic substances such as natural hormones diffuse through the cell membrane and bind to nuclear receptors located in the cytosol (type I NR) or nucleus (type II, III, or IV NR) of the cell. Binding causes a conformational change in the receptor which, depending on the class of receptor, triggers a cascade of downstream events that direct the NRs to DNA transcription regulation sites which result in up or down-regulation of gene expression. They generally function as homo/heterodimers.

=== Type I ===
Ligand binding to type I nuclear receptors in the cytosol results in the dissociation of heat shock proteins, homo-dimerization, translocation (i.e., active transport) from the cytoplasm into the cell nucleus, and binding to specific sequences of DNA known as hormone response elements (HREs). Type I nuclear receptors bind to HREs consisting of two half-sites separated by a variable length of DNA, and the second half-site has a sequence inverted from the first (inverted repeat). Type I nuclear receptors include members of subfamily 3, such as the androgen receptor, estrogen receptors, glucocorticoid receptor, and progesterone receptor.

The nuclear receptor/DNA complex then recruits other proteins that transcribe DNA downstream from the HRE into messenger RNA and eventually protein, which causes a change in cell function.

=== Type II ===
Type II receptors, in contrast to type I, are retained in the nucleus regardless of the ligand binding status and in addition bind as hetero-dimers (usually with RXR) to DNA. In the absence of ligand, type II nuclear receptors are often complexed with corepressor proteins. Ligand binding to the nuclear receptor causes dissociation of corepressor and recruitment of coactivator proteins. Additional proteins including RNA polymerase are then recruited to the NR/DNA complex that transcribe DNA into messenger RNA.

Type II nuclear receptors include principally subfamily 1, for example the retinoic acid receptor and thyroid hormone receptor.

=== Type III ===
Type III nuclear receptors are similar to classical type II receptors in that they reside in the nucleus and bind to direct repeats. However, unlike type II receptors (and like type I nuclear receptors) they bind with another copy of the same receptor as a homodimer rather than a heterodimer. A notable example is the vitamin D receptor, which can function either as a homodimer (type III) or as a heterodimer bound to RXR (type II).

=== Type IV ===
Type IV nuclear receptors are similar to type II, except they bind as monomers to HREs that are extended half sites. Notable examples include SF-1 (NR5A1) and LRH-1 (NR5A2).

== Dimerization ==
Human nuclear receptors are capable of dimerizing with many other nuclear receptors (homotypic dimerization), as has been shown from large-scale Y2H experiments and text mining efforts of the literature that were focused on specific interactions. Nevertheless, there exists specificity, with members of the same subfamily having very similar NR dimerization partners and the underlying dimerization network has certain topological features, such as the presence of highly connected hubs (RXR and SHP).

== Coregulatory proteins ==
Nuclear receptors bound to hormone response elements recruit a significant number of other proteins (referred to as transcription coregulators) that facilitate or inhibit the transcription of the associated target gene into mRNA. The function of these coregulators are varied and include chromatin remodeling (making the target gene either more or less accessible to transcription) or a bridging function to stabilize the binding of other coregulatory proteins. Nuclear receptors may bind specifically to a number of coregulator proteins, and thereby influence cellular mechanisms of signal transduction both directly, as well as indirectly.

=== Coactivators ===
Binding of agonist ligands (see section below) to nuclear receptors induces a conformation of the receptor that preferentially binds coactivator proteins. These proteins often have an intrinsic histone acetyltransferase (HAT) activity, which weakens the association of histones to DNA, and therefore promotes gene transcription.

=== Corepressors ===
Binding of antagonist ligands to nuclear receptors in contrast induces a conformation of the receptor that preferentially binds corepressor proteins. These proteins, in turn, recruit histone deacetylases (HDACs), which strengthens the association of histones to DNA, and therefore represses gene transcription.

== Agonism vs antagonism ==
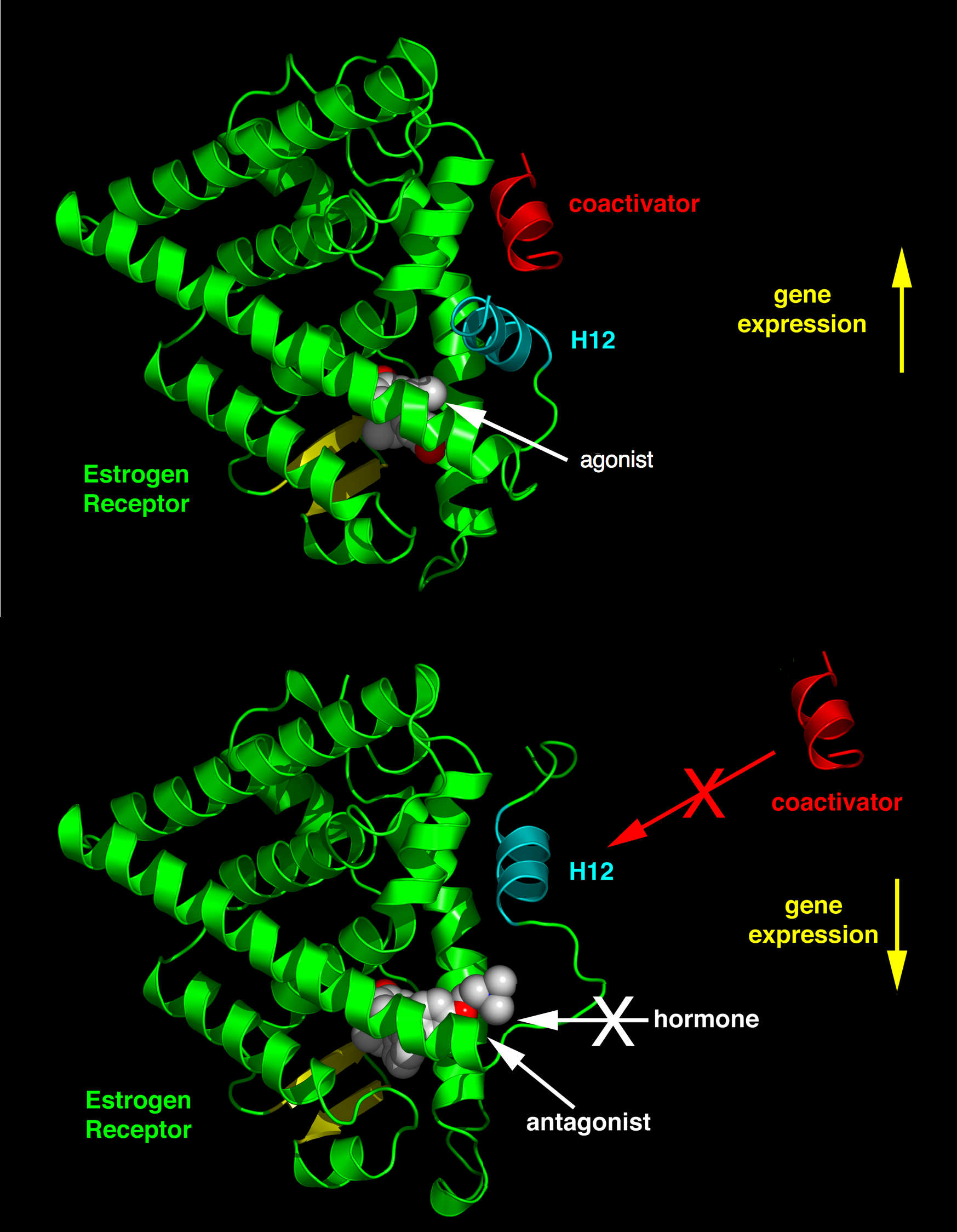
Structural basis for the mechanism of nuclear receptor agonist and antagonist action. The structures shown here are of the ligand binding domain (LBD) of the estrogen receptor (green cartoon diagram) complexed with either the agonist diethylstilbestrol (top, PDB: 3ERD) or antagonist 4-hydroxytamoxifen (bottom, 3ERT). The ligands are depicted as space filling spheres (white = carbon, red = oxygen). When an agonist is bound to a nuclear receptor, the C-terminal alpha helix of the LBD (H12; light blue) is positioned such that a coactivator protein (red) can bind to the surface of the LBD. Shown here is just a small part of the coactivator protein, the so-called NR box containing the LXXLL amino acid sequence motif. Antagonists occupy the same ligand binding cavity of the nuclear receptor. However antagonist ligands in addition have a sidechain extension which sterically displaces H12 to occupy roughly the same position in space as coactivators bind. Hence coactivator binding to the LBD is blocked.

Depending on the receptor involved, the chemical structure of the ligand and the tissue that is being affected, nuclear receptor ligands may display dramatically diverse effects ranging in a spectrum from agonism to antagonism to inverse agonism.

=== Agonists ===
The activity of endogenous ligands (such as the hormones estradiol and testosterone) when bound to their cognate nuclear receptors is normally to upregulate gene expression. This stimulation of gene expression by the ligand is referred to as an agonist response. The agonistic effects of endogenous hormones can also be mimicked by certain synthetic ligands, for example, the glucocorticoid receptor anti-inflammatory drug dexamethasone. Agonist ligands work by inducing a conformation of the receptor which favors coactivator binding (see upper half of the figure to the right).

=== Antagonists ===
Other synthetic nuclear receptor ligands have no apparent effect on gene transcription in the absence of endogenous ligand. However they block the effect of agonist through competitive binding to the same binding site in the nuclear receptor. These ligands are referred to as antagonists. An example of antagonistic nuclear receptor drug is mifepristone which binds to the glucocorticoid and progesterone receptors and therefore blocks the activity of the endogenous hormones cortisol and progesterone respectively. Antagonist ligands work by inducing a conformation of the receptor which prevents coactivator binding, and promotes corepressor binding (see lower half of the figure to the right).

=== Inverse agonists ===
Finally, some nuclear receptors promote a low level of gene transcription in the absence of agonists (also referred to as basal or constitutive activity). Synthetic ligands which reduce this basal level of activity in nuclear receptors are known as inverse agonists.

=== Selective receptor modulators ===
A number of drugs that work through nuclear receptors display an agonist response in some tissues and an antagonistic response in other tissues. This behavior may have substantial benefits since it may allow retaining the desired beneficial therapeutic effects of a drug while minimizing undesirable side effects. Drugs with this mixed agonist/antagonist profile of action are referred to as selective receptor modulators (SRMs). Examples include Selective Androgen Receptor Modulators (SARMs), Selective Estrogen Receptor Modulators (SERMs) and Selective Progesterone Receptor Modulators (SPRMs). The mechanism of action of SRMs may vary depending on the chemical structure of the ligand and the receptor involved, however it is thought that many SRMs work by promoting a conformation of the receptor that is closely balanced between agonism and antagonism. In tissues where the concentration of coactivator proteins is higher than corepressors, the equilibrium is shifted in the agonist direction. Conversely in tissues where corepressors dominate, the ligand behaves as an antagonist.

== Alternative mechanisms ==
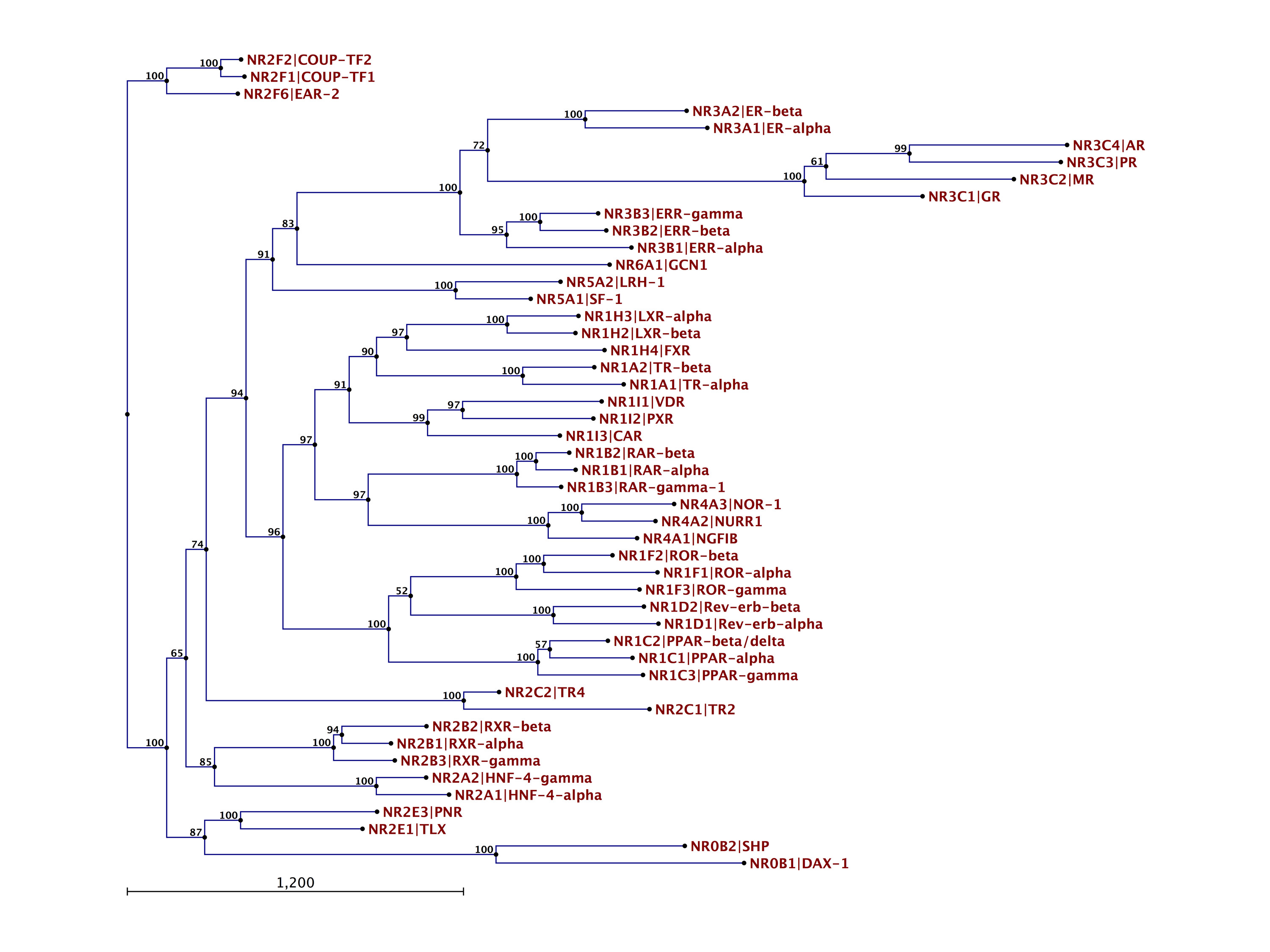
Phylogenetic tree of human nuclear receptors

=== Transrepression ===
The most common mechanism of nuclear receptor action involves direct binding of the nuclear receptor to a DNA hormone response element. This mechanism is referred to as transactivation. However some nuclear receptors not only have the ability to directly bind to DNA, but also to other transcription factors. This binding often results in deactivation of the second transcription factor in a process known as transrepression. One example of a nuclear receptor that are able to transrepress is the glucocorticoid receptor (GR). Furthermore, certain GR ligands known as Selective Glucocorticoid Receptor Agonists (SEGRAs) are able to activate GR in such a way that GR more strongly transrepresses than transactivates. This selectivity increases the separation between the desired antiinflammatory effects and undesired metabolic side effects of these selective glucocorticoids.

=== Non-genomic ===
The classical direct effects of nuclear receptors on gene regulation normally take hours before a functional effect is seen in cells because of the large number of intermediate steps between nuclear receptor activation and changes in protein expression levels. However it has been observed that many effects of the application of nuclear hormones, such as changes in ion channel activity, occur within minutes which is inconsistent with the classical mechanism of nuclear receptor action. While the molecular target for these non-genomic effects of nuclear receptors has not been conclusively demonstrated, it has been hypothesized that there are variants of nuclear receptors which are membrane associated instead of being localized in the cytosol or nucleus. Furthermore, these membrane associated receptors function through alternative signal transduction mechanisms not involving gene regulation.

While it has been hypothesized that there are several membrane associated receptors for nuclear hormones, many of the rapid effects have been shown to require canonical nuclear receptors. However, testing the relative importance of the genomic and nongenomic mechanisms in vivo has been prevented by the absence of specific molecular mechanisms for the nongenomic effects that could be blocked by mutation of the receptor without disrupting its direct effects on gene expression.

A molecular mechanism for non-genomic signaling through the nuclear thyroid hormone receptor TRβ involves the phosphatidylinositol 3-kinase (PI3K). This signaling can be blocked by a single tyrosine to phenylalanine substitution in TRβ without disrupting direct gene regulation. When mice were created with this single, conservative amino acid substitution in TRβ, synaptic maturation and plasticity in the hippocampus was impaired almost as effectively as completely blocking thyroid hormone synthesis. This mechanism appears to be conserved in all mammals but not in TRα or any other nuclear receptors. Thus, phosphotyrosine-dependent association of TRβ with PI3K provides a potential mechanism for integrating regulation of development and metabolism by thyroid hormone and receptor tyrosine kinases. In addition, thyroid hormone signaling through PI3K can alter gene expression.

== Family members ==
The following is a list of the 48 known human nuclear receptors (and their orthologs in other species) categorized according to sequence homology. The list also includes selected family members that lack human orthologs (NRNC symbol highlighted in yellow).

Subfamily		Group		Member				
Subfamily		Group		NRNC Symbol	Abbreviation	Name	Gene	Ligand(s)
1	Thyroid Hormone Receptor-like	A	Thyroid hormone receptor	NR1A1	TRα	Thyroid hormone receptor-α	THRA	thyroid hormone
1	Thyroid Hormone Receptor-like	A	Thyroid hormone receptor	NR1A2	TRβ	Thyroid hormone receptor-β	THRB	thyroid hormone
1	Thyroid Hormone Receptor-like	B	Retinoic acid receptor	NR1B1	RARα	Retinoic acid receptor-α	RARA	vitamin A and related compounds
1	Thyroid Hormone Receptor-like	B	Retinoic acid receptor	NR1B2	RARβ	Retinoic acid receptor-β	RARB	vitamin A and related compounds
1	Thyroid Hormone Receptor-like	B	Retinoic acid receptor	NR1B3	RARγ	Retinoic acid receptor-γ	RARG	vitamin A and related compounds
1	Thyroid Hormone Receptor-like	C	Peroxisome proliferator-activated receptor	NR1C1	PPARα	Peroxisome proliferator-activated receptor-α	PPARA	fatty acids, prostaglandins
1	Thyroid Hormone Receptor-like	C	Peroxisome proliferator-activated receptor	NR1C2	PPAR-β/δ	Peroxisome proliferator-activated receptor-β/δ	PPARD	fatty acids, prostaglandins
1	Thyroid Hormone Receptor-like	C	Peroxisome proliferator-activated receptor	NR1C3	PPARγ	Peroxisome proliferator-activated receptor-γ	PPARG	fatty acids, prostaglandins
1	Thyroid Hormone Receptor-like	D	Rev-ErbA	NR1D1	Rev-ErbAα	Rev-ErbAα	NR1D1	heme
1	Thyroid Hormone Receptor-like	D	Rev-ErbA	NR1D2	Rev-ErbAβ	Rev-ErbAα	NR1D2	heme
1	Thyroid Hormone Receptor-like	E	E78C-like (arthropod, trematode, mullosc, nematode)	NR1E1	Eip78C	Ecdysone-induced protein 78C	Eip78C	
1	Thyroid Hormone Receptor-like	F	RAR-related orphan receptor	NR1F1	RORα	RAR-related orphan receptor-α	RORA	cholesterol, ATRA
1	Thyroid Hormone Receptor-like	F	RAR-related orphan receptor	NR1F2	RORβ	RAR-related orphan receptor-β	RORB	cholesterol, ATRA
1	Thyroid Hormone Receptor-like	F	RAR-related orphan receptor	NR1F3	RORγ	RAR-related orphan receptor-γ	RORC	cholesterol, ATRA
1	Thyroid Hormone Receptor-like	G	CNR14-like (nematode)	NR1G1	sex-1	Steroid hormone receptor cnr14	sex-1	
1	Thyroid Hormone Receptor-like	H	Liver X receptor-like	NR1H1	EcR	Ecdysone receptor, EcR (arthropod)	EcR	ecdysteroids
1	Thyroid Hormone Receptor-like	H	Liver X receptor-like	NR1H2	LXRβ	Liver X receptor-β	NR1H2	oxysterols
1	Thyroid Hormone Receptor-like	H	Liver X receptor-like	NR1H3	LXRα	Liver X receptor-α	NR1H3	oxysterols
1	Thyroid Hormone Receptor-like	H	Liver X receptor-like	NR1H4	FXR	Farnesoid X receptor	NR1H4	oxysterols
1	Thyroid Hormone Receptor-like	H	Liver X receptor-like	NR1H5	FXR-β	Farnesoid X receptor-β (pseudogene in human)	NR1H5P	oxysterols
1	Thyroid Hormone Receptor-like	I	Vitamin D receptor-like	NR1I1	VDR	Vitamin D receptor	VDR	vitamin D
1	Thyroid Hormone Receptor-like	I	Vitamin D receptor-like	NR1I2	PXR	Pregnane X receptor	NR1I2	xenobiotics
1	Thyroid Hormone Receptor-like	I	Vitamin D receptor-like	NR1I3	CAR	Constitutive androstane receptor	NR1I3	androstane
1	Thyroid Hormone Receptor-like	J	Hr96-like	NR1J1	Hr96/Daf-12	Nuclear hormone receptor HR96	Hr96	cholesterol/dafachronic acid
1	Thyroid Hormone Receptor-like	J	Hr96-like	NR1J2				
1	Thyroid Hormone Receptor-like	J	Hr96-like	NR1J3				
1	Thyroid Hormone Receptor-like	K	Hr1-like	NR1K1	Hr1	Nuclear hormone receptor HR1		
2	Retinoid X Receptor-like	A	Hepatocyte nuclear factor-4	NR2A1	HNF4α	Hepatocyte nuclear factor-4-α	HNF4A	fatty acids
2	Retinoid X Receptor-like	A	Hepatocyte nuclear factor-4	NR2A2	HNF4γ	Hepatocyte nuclear factor-4-γ	HNF4G	fatty acids
2	Retinoid X Receptor-like	B	Retinoid X receptor	NR2B1	RXRα	Retinoid X receptor-α	RXRA	retinoids
2	Retinoid X Receptor-like	B	Retinoid X receptor	NR2B2	RXRβ	Retinoid X receptor-β	RXRB	retinoids
2	Retinoid X Receptor-like	B	Retinoid X receptor	NR2B3	RXRγ	Retinoid X receptor-γ	RXRG	retinoids
2	Retinoid X Receptor-like	B	Retinoid X receptor	NR2B4	USP	Ultraspiracle protein (arthropod)	usp	phospholipids
2	Retinoid X Receptor-like	C	Testicular receptor	NR2C1	TR2	Testicular receptor 2	NR2C1	
2	Retinoid X Receptor-like	C	Testicular receptor	NR2C2	TR4	Testicular receptor 4	NR2C2	
2	Retinoid X Receptor-like	E	TLX/PNR	NR2E1	TLX	Homologue of the Drosophila tailless gene	NR2E1	
2	Retinoid X Receptor-like	E	TLX/PNR	NR2E3	PNR	Photoreceptor cell-specific nuclear receptor	NR2E3	
2	Retinoid X Receptor-like	F	COUP/EAR	NR2F1	COUP-TFI	Chicken ovalbumin upstream promoter-transcription factor I	NR2F1	
2	Retinoid X Receptor-like	F	COUP/EAR	NR2F2	COUP-TFII	Chicken ovalbumin upstream promoter-transcription factor II	NR2F2	retinoic acid (weak)
2	Retinoid X Receptor-like	F	COUP/EAR	NR2F6	EAR-2	V-erbA-related	NR2F6	
3	Estrogen Receptor-like	A	Estrogen receptor	NR3A1	ERα	Estrogen receptor-α	ESR1	estrogens
3	Estrogen Receptor-like	A	Estrogen receptor	NR3A2	ERβ	Estrogen receptor-β	ESR2	estrogens
3	Estrogen Receptor-like	B	Estrogen related receptor	NR3B1	ERRα	Estrogen-related receptor-α	ESRRA	
3	Estrogen Receptor-like	B	Estrogen related receptor	NR3B2	ERRβ	Estrogen-related receptor-β	ESRRB	
3	Estrogen Receptor-like	B	Estrogen related receptor	NR3B3	ERRγ	Estrogen-related receptor-γ	ESRRG	
3	Estrogen Receptor-like	C	3-Ketosteroid receptors	NR3C1	GR	Glucocorticoid receptor	NR3C1	cortisol
3	Estrogen Receptor-like	C	3-Ketosteroid receptors	NR3C2	MR	Mineralocorticoid receptor	NR3C2	aldosterone
3	Estrogen Receptor-like	C	3-Ketosteroid receptors	NR3C3	PR	Progesterone receptor	PGR	progesterone
3	Estrogen Receptor-like	C	3-Ketosteroid receptors	NR3C4	AR	Androgen receptor	AR	testosterone
3	Estrogen Receptor-like	D	Estrogen Receptor-like (in lophotrochozoa)	NR3D				
3	Estrogen Receptor-like	E	Estrogen Receptor-like (in cnidaria)	NR3E				
3	Estrogen Receptor-like	F	Estrogen Receptor-like (in placozoa)	NR3F				
4	Nerve Growth Factor IB-like	A	NGFIB/NURR1/NOR1	NR4A1	NGFIB	Nerve Growth factor IB	NR4A1	
4	Nerve Growth Factor IB-like	A	NGFIB/NURR1/NOR1	NR4A2	NURR1	Nuclear receptor related 1	NR4A2	
4	Nerve Growth Factor IB-like	A	NGFIB/NURR1/NOR1	NR4A3	NOR1	Neuron-derived orphan receptor 1	NR4A3	
5	Steroidogenic; Factor-like	A	SF1/LRH1	NR5A1	SF1	Steroidogenic factor 1	NR5A1	phosphatidylinositols
5	Steroidogenic; Factor-like	A	SF1/LRH1	NR5A2	LRH-1	Liver receptor homolog-1	NR5A2	phosphatidylinositols
5	Steroidogenic; Factor-like	B	Hr39-like	NR5B1	HR39/FTZ-F1	Nuclear hormone receptor fushi tarazu factor I beta	Hr39	
6	Germ Cell Nuclear Factor-like	A	GCNF	NR6A1	GCNF	Germ cell nuclear factor	NR6A1	
7	NRs with two DNA binding domains	A	2DBD-NRα	NR7A1	2DBD-NRA2			
7	NRs with two DNA binding domains	B	2DBD-NRβ	NR7B1	2DBD-NRA3			
7	NRs with two DNA binding domains	C	2DBD-NRγ	NR7C1	2DBD-NRA1	arthropod "α/β"		
8	NR8 (eumetazoa)	A	NR8A	NR8A1	CgNR8A1	Nuclear receptor 8	AKG49571	
0	Miscellaneous (lacks either LBD or DBD)	A	knr/knrl/egon (arthropods)	NR0A1	KNI	Zygotic gap protein knirps	knl	
0	Miscellaneous (lacks either LBD or DBD)	B	DAX/SHP	NR0B1	DAX1	Dosage-sensitive sex reversal, adrenal hypoplasia critical region, on chromosome X, gene 1	NR0B1	
0	Miscellaneous (lacks either LBD or DBD)	B	DAX/SHP	NR0B2	SHP	Small heterodimer partner	NR0B2	

Of the two 0-families, 0A has a family 1-like DBD, and 0B has a unique LBD. The second DBD of family 7 is probably related to the family 1 DBD. Three probably family-1 NRs from Biomphalaria glabrata possess a DBD along with a family 0B-like LBD. The placement of C. elegans nhr-1 (Q21878) is disputed: although most sources place it as NR1K1, manual annotation at WormBase considers it a member of NR2A. There used to be a group 2D for which the only member was Drosophila HR78/NR1D1 (Q24142) and orthologues, but it was merged into group 2C later due to high similarity, forming a "group 2C/D". Knockout studies on mice and fruit flies support such a merged group.

== Evolution ==
A topic of debate has been on the identity of the ancestral nuclear receptor as either a ligand-binding or an orphan receptor. This debate began more than twenty-five years ago when the first ligands were identified as mammalian steroid and thyroid hormones. Shortly thereafter, the identification of the ecdysone receptor in Drosophila introduced the idea that nuclear receptors were hormonal receptors that bind ligands with a nanomolar affinity. At the time, the three known nuclear receptor ligands were steroids, retinoids, and thyroid hormone, and of those three, both steroids and retinoids were products of terpenoid metabolism. Thus, it was postulated that ancestral receptor would have been liganded by a terpenoid molecule.

In 1992, a comparison of the DNA-binding domain of all known nuclear receptors led to the construction of a phylogenic tree of nuclear receptor that indicated that all nuclear receptors shared a common ancestor. As a result, there was an increased effort upon uncovering the state of the first nuclear receptor, and by 1997 an alternative hypothesis was suggested: the ancestral nuclear receptor was an orphan receptor and it acquired ligand-binding ability over time This hypothesis was proposed based on the following arguments:

1. The nuclear receptor sequences that had been identified in the earliest metazoans (cnidarians and Schistosoma) were all members of the COUP-TF, RXR, and FTZ-F1 groups of receptors. Both COUP-TF and FTZ-F1 are orphan receptors, and RXR is only found to bind a ligand in vertebrates.
2. While orphan receptors had known arthropod homologs, no orthologs of liganded vertebrate receptors had been identified outside vertebrates, suggesting that orphan receptors are older than liganded-receptors.
3. Orphan receptors are found amongst all six subfamilies of nuclear receptors, while ligand-dependent receptors are found amongst three. Thus, since the ligand-dependent receptors were believed to be predominantly member of recent subfamilies, it seemed logical that they gained the ability to bind ligands independently.
4. The phylogenetic position of a given nuclear receptor within the tree correlates to its DNA-binding domain and dimerization abilities, but there is no identified relationship between a ligand-dependent nuclear receptor and the chemical nature of its ligand. In addition to this, the evolutionary relationships between ligand-dependent receptors did not make much sense as closely related receptors of subfamilies bound ligands originating from entirely different biosynthetic pathways (e.g. TRs and RARs). On the other hand, subfamilies that are not evolutionarily related bind similar ligands (RAR and RXR both bind all-trans and 9-cis retinoic acid respectively).
5. In 1997, it was discovered that nuclear receptors did not exist in static off and on conformations, but that a ligand could alter the equilibrium between the two states. Furthermore, it was found that nuclear receptors could be regulated in a ligand-independent manner, through either phosphorylation or other post-translational modifications. Thus, this provided a mechanism for how an ancestral orphan receptor was regulated in a ligand-independent manner, and explained why the ligand binding domain was conserved.

Over the next 10 years, experiments were conducted to test this hypothesis and counterarguments soon emerged:

1. Nuclear receptors were identified in the newly sequenced genome of the demosponge Amphimedon queenslandica, a member Porifera, the most ancient metazoan phylum. The A. queenslandica genome contains two nuclear receptors known as AqNR1 and AqNR2 and both were characterized to bind and be regulated by ligands.
2. Homologs for ligand-dependent vertebrate receptors were found outside vertebrates in mollusks and Platyhelminthes. Furthermore, the nuclear receptors found in cnidarians were found to have structural ligands in mammals, which could mirror the ancestral situation.
3. Two putative orphan receptors, HNF4 and USP were found, via structural and mass spectrometry analysis, to bind fatty acids and phospholipids respectively.
4. Nuclear receptors and ligands are found to be a lot less specific than was previously thought. Retinoids can bind mammalian receptors other than RAR and RXR such as, PPAR, RORb, or COUP-TFII. Furthermore, RXR is sensitive to a wide range of molecules including retinoids, fatty acids, and phospholipids.
5. Study of steroid receptor evolution revealed that the ancestral steroid receptor could bind a ligand, estradiol. Conversely, the estrogen receptor found in mollusks is constitutively active and did not bind estrogen-related hormones. Thus, this provided an example of how an ancestral ligand-dependent receptor could lose its ability to bind ligands.

A combination of this recent evidence, as well as an in-depth study of the physical structure of the nuclear receptor ligand binding domain has led to the emergence of a new hypothesis regarding the ancestral state of the nuclear receptor. This hypothesis suggests that the ancestral receptor may act as a lipid sensor with an ability to bind, albeit rather weakly, several different hydrophobic molecules such as, retinoids, steroids, hemes, and fatty acids. With its ability to interact with a variety of compounds, this receptor, through duplications, would either lose its ability for ligand-dependent activity, or specialize into a highly specific receptor for a particular molecule.

== History ==
Below is a brief selection of key events in the history of nuclear receptor research.

- 1905 – Ernest Starling coined the word hormone
- 1926 – Edward Calvin Kendall and Tadeus Reichstein isolated and determined the structures of cortisone and thyroxine
- 1929 – Adolf Butenandt and Edward Adelbert Doisy – independently isolated and determined the structure of estrogen
- 1958 – Elwood Jensen – isolated the estrogen receptor
- 1980s – cloning of the estrogen, glucocorticoid, and thyroid hormone receptors by Pierre Chambon, Ronald Evans, and Björn Vennström respectively
- 2004 – Pierre Chambon, Ronald Evans, and Elwood Jensen were awarded the Albert Lasker Award for Basic Medical Research, an award that frequently precedes a Nobel Prize in Medicine

== See also ==
- NucleaRDB
- Thyroid hormone receptor
- Steroid hormone receptor
- Receptors
