= Thyroid hormone receptor beta =

Protein-coding gene in the species Homo sapiens

THRB
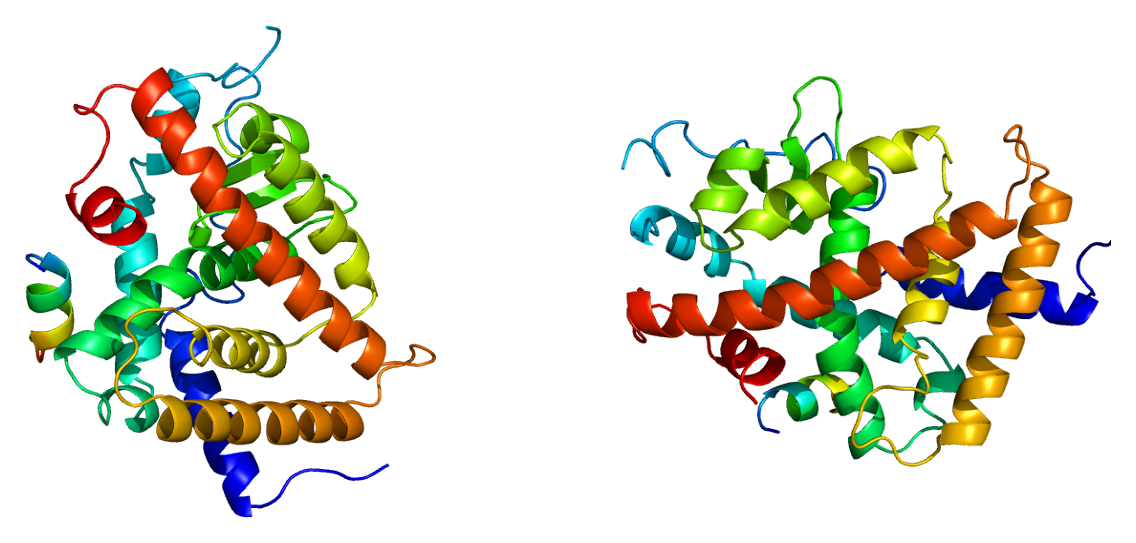

Identifiers
- Aliases: THRB, C-ERBA-2, C-ERBA-BETA, ERBA2, GRTH, NR1A2, PRTH, THR1, THRB1, THRB2, thyroid hormone receptor beta, TRbeta
- External IDs: OMIM: 190160; MGI: 98743; GeneCards: THRB
Available structures
PDB	Ortholog search: PDBe RCSB
PDB	List of PDB id codes 1BSX, 1N46, 1NAX, 1NQ0, 1NQ1, 1NQ2, 1NUO, 1Q4X, 1R6G, 1XZX, 1Y0X, 2J4A, 2NLL, 2PIN, 3D57, 3GWS, 3IMY, 3JZC, 4ZO1

Gene location (Human)
Chr.	Chromosome 3 (human)
Band	3p24.2	Start	24,117,153 bp
Band	3p24.2	End	24,495,756 bp

Gene location (Mouse)
Chr.	Chromosome 14 (mouse)
Band	14|14 A1	Start	4,431,611 bp
Band	14|14 A1	End	4,809,435 bp
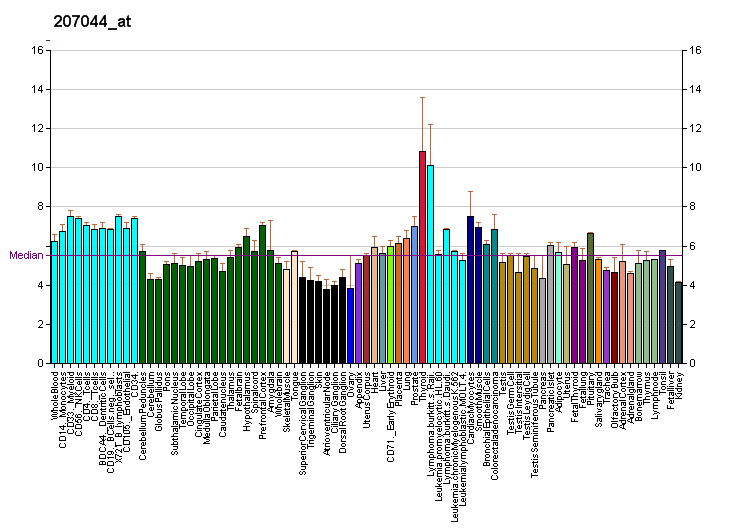
RNA expression pattern
Bgee	Human / Mouse (ortholog); Top expressed in: Brodmann area 23; middle temporal gyrus; tibia; postcentral gyrus; endothelial cell; superior frontal gyrus; entorhinal cortex; Achilles tendon; lactiferous duct; parotid gland / Top expressed in: auditory system; spiral ganglion; neural layer of retina; organ of Corti; right kidney; superior frontal gyrus; dentate gyrus of hippocampal formation granule cell; primary visual cortex; muscle of thigh; proximal tubule; More reference expression data
BioGPS	More reference expression data
Gene ontology
Molecular function	sequence-specific DNA binding; transcription corepressor activity; zinc ion binding; metal ion binding; steroid hormone receptor activity; protein binding; enzyme binding; chromatin DNA binding; thyroid hormone binding; DNA-binding transcription factor activity; DNA binding; DNA-binding transcription factor activity, RNA polymerase II-specific; transcription cis-regulatory region binding; RNA polymerase II transcription regulatory region sequence-specific DNA binding; transcription factor binding; nuclear receptor coactivator activity; signaling receptor activity; nuclear receptor activity
Cellular component	nucleoplasm; nucleus; nuclear body; RNA polymerase II transcription regulator complex
Biological process	regulation of transcription, DNA-templated; regulation of heart contraction; female courtship behavior; regulation of transcription by RNA polymerase II; negative regulation of transcription by RNA polymerase II; hearing; type I pneumocyte differentiation; negative regulation of female receptivity; animal organ morphogenesis; transcription initiation from RNA polymerase II promoter; negative regulation of transcription, DNA-templated; positive regulation of transcription by RNA polymerase II; steroid hormone mediated signaling pathway; intracellular receptor signaling pathway; transcription, DNA-templated; negative regulation of eye photoreceptor cell development; retinal cone cell development; retinal cone cell apoptotic process; multicellular organism development; hormone-mediated signaling pathway; cell differentiation; thyroid gland development; response to lipid; thyroid hormone mediated signaling pathway
Sources:Amigo / QuickGO
Orthologs
Databases	NCBI: entry; OMA: entry
Species	Human	Mouse
Entrez	7068	21834
Ensembl	ENSG00000151090	ENSMUSG00000021779
UniProt	P10828	P37242
RefSeq (mRNA)	NM_000461; NM_001128176; NM_001128177; NM_001252634; NM_001354708 NM_001354709; NM_001354710; NM_001354711; NM_001354712; NM_001354713; NM_001354714; NM_001354715; NM_001374822; NM_001374823; NM_001374824; NM_001374825; NM_001374826; NM_001374827	NM_001113417; NM_009380
RefSeq (protein)	NP_000452; NP_001121648; NP_001121649; NP_001239563; NP_001341637 NP_001341638; NP_001341639; NP_001341640; NP_001341641; NP_001341642; NP_001341643; NP_001341644; NP_001361751; NP_001361752; NP_001361753; NP_001361754; NP_001361755; NP_001361756	NP_001106888; NP_033406
Location (UCSC)	Chr 3: 24.12 – 24.5 Mb	Chr 14: 4.43 – 4.81 Mb
PubMed search
- Wikidata
View/Edit Human	View/Edit Mouse

Thyroid hormone receptor beta (TR-beta) also known as nuclear receptor subfamily 1, group A, member 2 (NR1A2), is a nuclear receptor protein that in humans is encoded by the THRB gene.

== Function ==
The protein encoded by this gene is a nuclear hormone receptor for triiodothyronine (T_{3}). It is one of the several receptors for thyroid hormone, and has been shown to mediate the biological activities of thyroid hormone. Knockout studies in mice suggest that the different receptors, while having certain extent of redundancy, may mediate different functions of thyroid hormone. Defects in this gene are known to be a cause of generalized thyroid hormone resistance (GTHR), a syndrome characterized by goiter and high levels of circulating thyroid hormone (T_{3}-T_{4}), with normal or slightly elevated thyroid stimulating hormone (TSH). Several transcript variants have been observed for this gene, but the full-length nature of only one has been observed so far.

== Interactions ==
Thyroid hormone receptor beta has been shown to interact with:

- BRD8,
- CCND1,
- NCOA1,
- NCOA6,
- NCOR2,
- NR2F6,
- PPARGC1A, and
- RXRA.
