= V-erbA-related gene =

Protein-coding gene in the species Homo sapiens

NR2F6

Identifiers
- Aliases: NR2F6, EAR-2, EAR2, ERBAL2, nuclear receptor subfamily 2 group F member 6
- External IDs: OMIM: 132880; MGI: 1352453; GeneCards: NR2F6

Gene location (Human)
Chr.	Chromosome 19 (human)
Band	19p13.11	Start	17,231,883 bp
Band	19p13.11	End	17,245,919 bp

Gene location (Mouse)
Chr.	Chromosome 8 (mouse)
Band	8 B3.3|8 34.43 cM	Start	71,826,767 bp
Band	8 B3.3|8 34.43 cM	End	71,834,604 bp
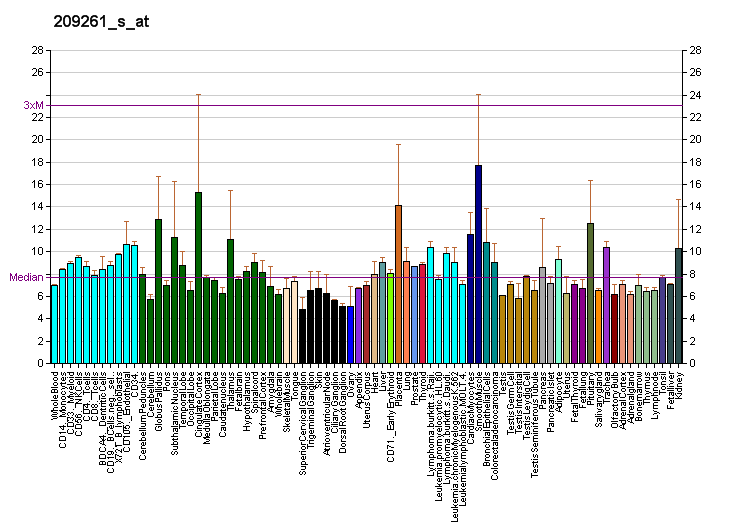

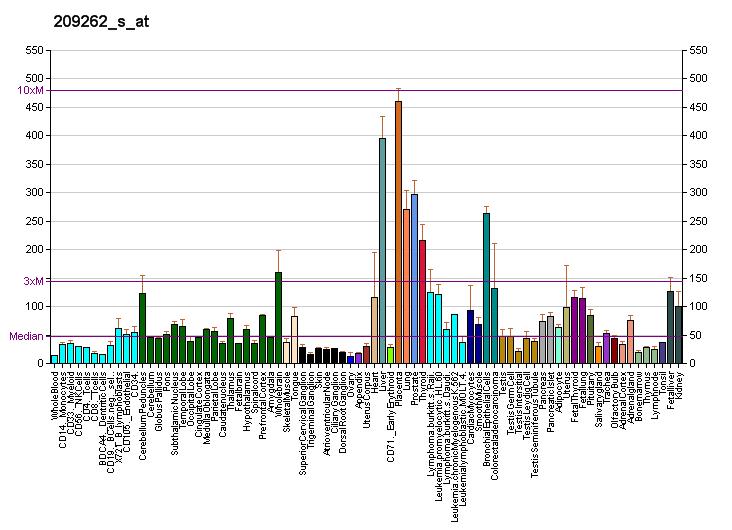
RNA expression pattern
Bgee	Human / Mouse (ortholog); Top expressed in: parotid gland; mucosa of transverse colon; nasal epithelium; jejunal mucosa; palpebral conjunctiva; right lobe of liver; mucosa of sigmoid colon; apex of heart; corpus epididymis; olfactory zone of nasal mucosa / Top expressed in: right kidney; Paneth cell; proximal tubule; left lobe of liver; internal carotid artery; external carotid artery; choroid plexus of fourth ventricle; cumulus cell; somite; transitional epithelium of urinary bladder; More reference expression data
BioGPS	More reference expression data
Gene ontology
Molecular function	metal ion binding; DNA-binding transcription repressor activity, RNA polymerase II-specific; sequence-specific DNA binding; RNA polymerase II cis-regulatory region sequence-specific DNA binding; zinc ion binding; nuclear receptor activity; DNA-binding transcription factor activity; DNA binding; protein binding; steroid hormone receptor activity; DNA-binding transcription factor activity, RNA polymerase II-specific
Cellular component	nucleoplasm; nucleus
Biological process	transcription, DNA-templated; signal transduction; detection of temperature stimulus involved in sensory perception of pain; entrainment of circadian clock by photoperiod; negative regulation of transcription by RNA polymerase II; steroid hormone mediated signaling pathway; transcription initiation from RNA polymerase II promoter; neuron development; regulation of transcription, DNA-templated; intracellular receptor signaling pathway
Sources:Amigo / QuickGO
Orthologs
Databases	NCBI: entry; OMA: entry
Species	Human	Mouse
Entrez	2063	13864
Ensembl	ENSG00000160113	ENSMUSG00000002393
UniProt	P10588	P43136
RefSeq (mRNA)	NM_005234	NM_010150
RefSeq (protein)	NP_005225; NP_005225.2	NP_034280
Location (UCSC)	Chr 19: 17.23 – 17.25 Mb	Chr 8: 71.83 – 71.83 Mb
PubMed search
- Wikidata
View/Edit Human	View/Edit Mouse

V-erbA-related protein 2 (EAR-2) also known as NR2F6 (nuclear receptor subfamily 2 group F member 6) is a protein that in humans is encoded by the NR2F6 gene. V-erbA-related protein 2 is a member of the nuclear receptor family of intracellular transcription factors. It is named after its similarity to v-erbA (P03373), a helper of an oncoprotein called v-erbB in avian erythroblastosis virus.

== Function ==
Comparatively little is known about ear-2, but it has been shown to function as a coregulator of other nuclear receptors.

== Interactions ==
V-erbA-related gene has been shown to interact with:

- COUP-TFII
- Thyroid hormone receptor beta
