= Photoreceptor cell-specific nuclear receptor =

Protein-coding gene in the species Homo sapiens

NR2E3

Identifiers
- Aliases: NR2E3, Nr2e3, A930035N01Rik, PNR, RNR, rd7, ESCS, RP37, nuclear receptor subfamily 2 group E member 3
- External IDs: OMIM: 604485; MGI: 1346317; GeneCards: NR2E3
Available structures
PDB	Ortholog search: PDBe RCSB
PDB	List of PDB id codes 4LOG

Gene location (Human)
Chr.	Chromosome 15 (human)
Band	15q23	Start	71,792,638 bp
Band	15q23	End	71,818,259 bp

Gene location (Mouse)
Chr.	Chromosome 9 (mouse)
Band	9 B|9 32.35 cM	Start	59,850,054 bp
Band	9 B|9 32.35 cM	End	59,867,942 bp
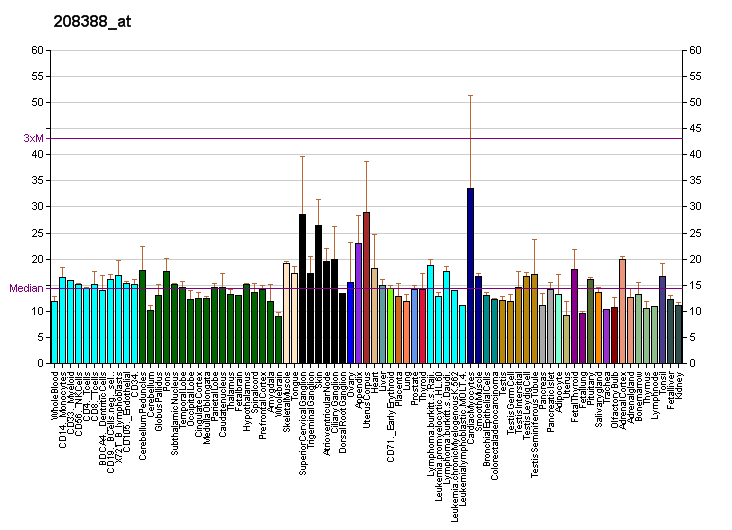
RNA expression pattern
Bgee	Human / Mouse (ortholog); Top expressed in: buccal mucosa cell; testicle; secondary oocyte; gonad; retinal pigment epithelium; right uterine tube; tendon of biceps brachii; prostate; fundus; Descending thoracic aorta / Top expressed in: neural layer of retina; outer nuclear layer; retinal pigment epithelium; epithelium of lens; zygote; embryo; epithelium of small intestine; secondary oocyte; primary oocyte; ileum; More reference expression data
BioGPS	More reference expression data
Gene ontology
Molecular function	DNA binding; DNA-binding transcription factor activity; zinc ion binding; metal ion binding; steroid hormone receptor activity; nuclear receptor activity; RNA polymerase II cis-regulatory region sequence-specific DNA binding; DNA-binding transcription activator activity, RNA polymerase II-specific; sequence-specific DNA binding
Cellular component	transcription regulator complex; nucleoplasm; nucleus
Biological process	phototransduction; regulation of transcription, DNA-templated; response to stimulus; negative regulation of transcription by RNA polymerase II; transcription by RNA polymerase II; transcription, DNA-templated; retina development in camera-type eye; eye photoreceptor cell development; transcription initiation from RNA polymerase II promoter; negative regulation of cell population proliferation; steroid hormone mediated signaling pathway; signal transduction; visual perception; intracellular receptor signaling pathway; positive regulation of transcription by RNA polymerase II
Sources:Amigo / QuickGO
Orthologs
Databases	NCBI: entry; OMA: entry
Species	Human	Mouse
Entrez	10002	23958
Ensembl	ENSG00000278570	ENSMUSG00000032292
UniProt	Q9Y5X4	Q9QXZ7
RefSeq (mRNA)	NM_001281446; NM_014249; NM_016346	NM_013708
RefSeq (protein)	NP_055064; NP_057430	NP_038736
Location (UCSC)	Chr 15: 71.79 – 71.82 Mb	Chr 9: 59.85 – 59.87 Mb
PubMed search
- Wikidata
View/Edit Human	View/Edit Mouse

NR2E3 (nuclear receptor subfamily 2, group E, member 3), also known as photoreceptor cell-specific nuclear receptor (PNR), is a protein that in humans is encoded by the NR2E3 gene. PNR is a member of the nuclear receptor super family of intracellular transcription factors.

== Function ==
NR2E3 was initially cloned from human retinoblastoma Y79 cells and a mouse λZAP eye cDNA library in 1999. In addition to retinal photoreceptor cells, NR2E3 is expressed in many tissues such as the urogenital and respiratory systems in humans and mice, suggesting potential functions beyond the retina cells. The main target genes of PNR as a transcription factor are rhodopsin and several opsins which are essential for sight.

Since 2011, NR2E3 has been implicated in tumorigenesis through activating p53 as a transcriptional cofactor. NR2E3 enhances p53 acetylation via forming a complex of NR2E3-p300-p53. NR2E3 mutants such as R76W and R97H, fail to activate p53. Interstingly, NR2E3 rescues the wild-type activity of many mutated p53, including R175H hot-spot gain-of-function mutation. Compound 11a, the agonist of NR2E3, has shown broad inhibitory effects on the cancer cells in NCI-60 cancer cell panel. 11a stimulates NR2E3-mediated p53 activation while also activating NR2E1 and NR2F2 in a less degree. The NR2E3-knock out mouse model suggests that NR2E3 may inhibit liver cancer growth.

== Structure and ligands ==
The crystal structure of PNR's ligand-binding domain is known. It self-dimerizes into, by default, a repressor state. Computer simulations based on this model shows that a ligand could possibly fit into PNR and switch it into a transcription activator. 13-cis retinoic acid is a known weak agonist that fits into such a pocket, but no physiologic ligand is known. Two synthetic compounds, 11A and 11B, appear to be agonists but do not go into the pocket and instead work as allosteric modulators. A more recent screening identifies another compound called photoregulin-1 (PR1) that functions as a reverse agonist, an activity possibly useful in the management of retinitis pigmentosa.

== Clinical significance ==
Mutations in the NR2E3 gene have been linked to several inherited retinal diseases, including enhanced S-cone syndrome (ESCS), a form of retinitis pigmentosa, and Goldmann-Favre syndrome.

By analyzing TCGA database and "All of Us" database, high expression of NR2E3 is associated with superior prognosis of cancer including breast cancer. The mutation frequency of NR2E3 is higher in four types of cancer, such as colon cancer, than in the regular population.
