= Pregnane X receptor =

Mammalian protein found in Homo sapiens

NR1I2
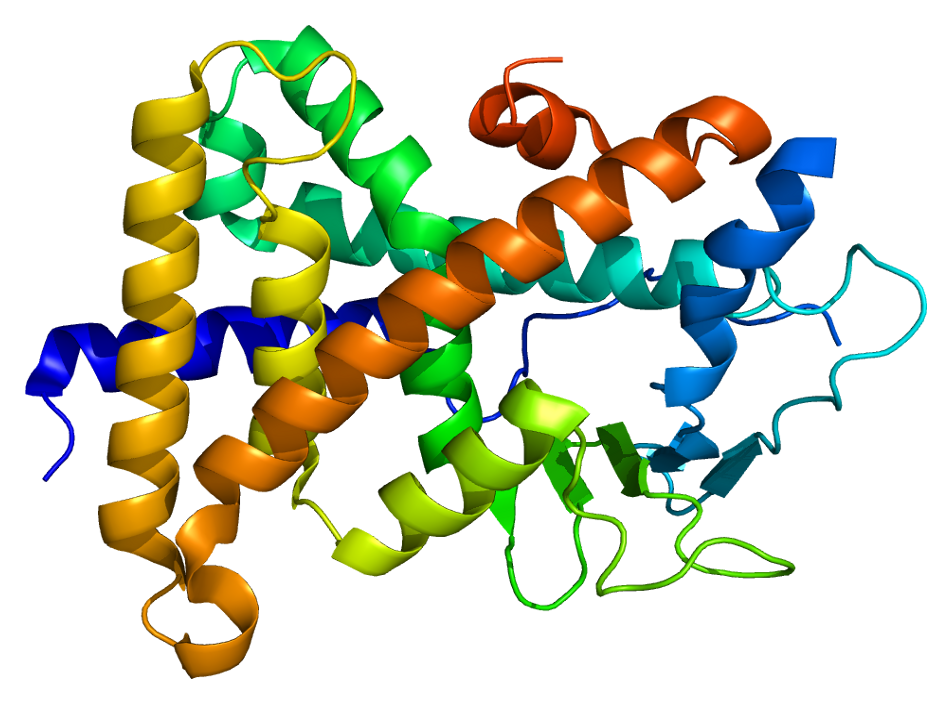

Identifiers
- Aliases: NR1I2, BXR, ONR1, PAR, PAR1, PAR2, PARq, PRR, PXR, SAR, SXR, nuclear receptor subfamily 1 group I member 2
- External IDs: OMIM: 603065; MGI: 1337040; GeneCards: NR1I2
Available structures
PDB	Ortholog search: PDBe RCSB
PDB	List of PDB id codes 1ILG, 1ILH, 1M13, 1NRL, 1SKX, 2O9I, 2QNV, 3CTB, 3HVL, 3R8D, 4J5W, 4J5X, 4NY9, 4S0S, 4S0T, 4XHD, 4X1F, 4X1G, 4XAO, 5A86

Gene location (Human)
Chr.	Chromosome 3 (human)
Band	3q13.33	Start	119,780,484 bp
Band	3q13.33	End	119,818,487 bp

Gene location (Mouse)
Chr.	Chromosome 16 (mouse)
Band	16|16 B3	Start	38,068,685 bp
Band	16|16 B3	End	38,115,186 bp
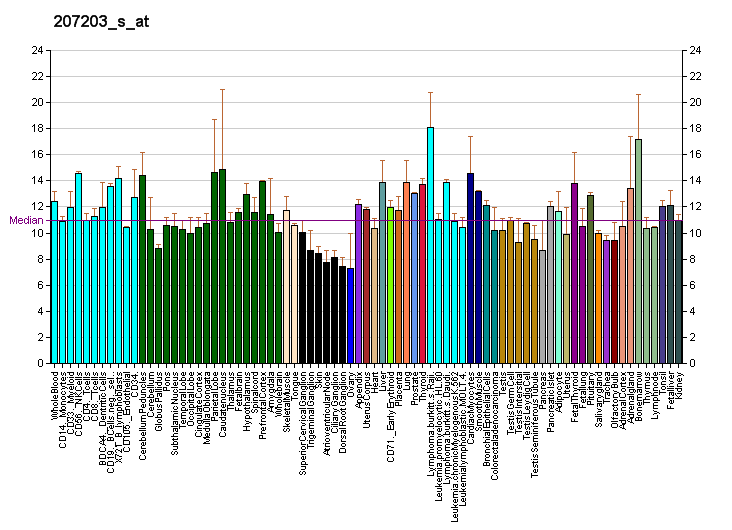

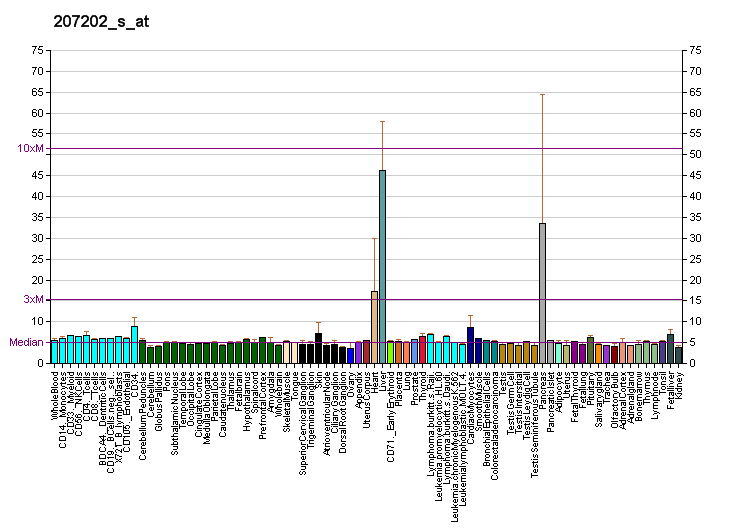
RNA expression pattern
Bgee	Human / Mouse (ortholog); Top expressed in: right lobe of liver; jejunal mucosa; mucosa of transverse colon; duodenum; rectum; mucosa of ileum; mucosa of sigmoid colon; gallbladder; cecum; appendix / Top expressed in: duodenum; jejunum; crypt of lieberkuhn of small intestine; colon; left colon; left lobe of liver; ileum; female urethra; lumbar subsegment of spinal cord; intestinal villus; More reference expression data
BioGPS	More reference expression data
Gene ontology
Molecular function	DNA binding; sequence-specific DNA binding; RNA polymerase II transcription regulatory region sequence-specific DNA binding; DNA-binding transcription factor activity; DNA-binding transcription activator activity, RNA polymerase II-specific; transcription coactivator activity; zinc ion binding; metal ion binding; steroid hormone receptor activity; nuclear receptor activity; protein binding; DNA-binding transcription factor activity, RNA polymerase II-specific; transcription cis-regulatory region binding; transcription factor binding; nuclear receptor coactivator activity; signaling receptor activity
Cellular component	nucleus; nucleoplasm; nuclear body; intermediate filament cytoskeleton; RNA polymerase II transcription regulator complex
Biological process	steroid metabolic process; regulation of transcription, DNA-templated; xenobiotic transport; xenobiotic export; transcription, DNA-templated; positive regulation of transcription, DNA-templated; positive regulation of gene expression; xenobiotic metabolic process; transcription initiation from RNA polymerase II promoter; negative regulation of transcription, DNA-templated; signal transduction; steroid hormone mediated signaling pathway; positive regulation of transcription by RNA polymerase II; intracellular receptor signaling pathway; multicellular organism development; cell differentiation
Sources:Amigo / QuickGO
Orthologs
Databases	NCBI: entry; OMA: entry
Species	Human	Mouse
Entrez	8856	18171
Ensembl	ENSG00000144852	ENSMUSG00000022809
UniProt	O75469	O54915
RefSeq (mRNA)	NM_033013; NM_003889; NM_022002	NM_001098404; NM_010936
RefSeq (protein)	NP_003880; NP_071285; NP_148934	NP_001091874; NP_035066
Location (UCSC)	Chr 3: 119.78 – 119.82 Mb	Chr 16: 38.07 – 38.12 Mb
PubMed search
- Wikidata
View/Edit Human	View/Edit Mouse

In the field of molecular biology, the pregnane X receptor (PXR), also known as the steroid and xenobiotic sensing nuclear receptor (SXR) or nuclear receptor subfamily 1, group I, member 2 (NR1I2) is a protein that in humans is encoded by the NR1I2 (nuclear Receptor subfamily 1, group I, member 2) gene.

== Function ==
PXR is a nuclear receptor whose primary function is to sense the presence of foreign toxic substances and in response up regulate the expression of proteins involved in the detoxification and clearance of these substances from the body. PXR belongs to the nuclear receptor superfamily, members of which are transcription factors characterized by a ligand-binding domain and a DNA-binding domain. PXR is a transcriptional regulator of the cytochrome P450 gene CYP3A4, binding to the response element of the CYP3A4 promoter as a heterodimer with the 9-cis retinoic acid receptor RXR. It is activated by a range of compounds that induce CYP3A4, including dexamethasone and rifampicin.

== Ligands ==
=== Agonists ===
PXR is activated by a large number of endogenous and exogenous chemicals including steroids (e.g., progesterone, 17α-hydroxyprogesterone, 17α-hydroxypregnenolone, 5α-dihydroprogesterone, 5β-dihydroprogesterone, allopregnanolone, corticosterone, cyproterone acetate, spironolactone, dexamethasone, mifepristone), antibiotics (e.g., rifampicin, rifaximin), antimycotics, bile acids, hyperforin (a constituent of St. John's Wort), and other compounds such as meclizine, paclitaxel, cafestol, and forskolin.

=== Antagonists ===
Ketoconazole is an example of one of the relatively few-known antagonists of the PXR. SPA70 (also known as LC-1) was recently identified and characterized as a potent and selective PXR antagonist.

== Mechanism ==
Like other type II nuclear receptors, when activated, it forms a heterodimer with the retinoid X receptor, and binds to hormone response elements on DNA which elicits expression of gene products.

One of the primary targets of PXR activation is the induction of CYP3A4, an important phase I oxidative enzyme that is responsible for the metabolism of many drugs. In addition, PXR up regulates the expression of phase II conjugating enzymes such as glutathione S-transferase and phase III transport uptake and efflux proteins such as OATP2 and MDR1.

== See also ==
- Constitutive androstane receptor
- Farnesoid X receptor
