= COUP-TFII =

Protein found in humans

NR2F2

Identifiers
- Aliases: NR2F2, ARP1, CHTD4, COUPTFB, COUPTFII, NF-E3, NR2F1, SVP40, TFCOUP2, COUP-TFII, nuclear receptor subfamily 2 group F member 2, COUPTF2, ARP-1, SRXX5
- External IDs: OMIM: 107773; MGI: 1352452; GeneCards: NR2F2
Available structures
PDB	Ortholog search: PDBe RCSB
PDB	List of PDB id codes 3CJW

Gene location (Human)
Chr.	Chromosome 15 (human)
Band	15q26.2	Start	96,325,938 bp
Band	15q26.2	End	96,340,263 bp

Gene location (Mouse)
Chr.	Chromosome 7 (mouse)
Band	7 C|7 38.66 cM	Start	70,001,692 bp
Band	7 C|7 38.66 cM	End	70,016,483 bp
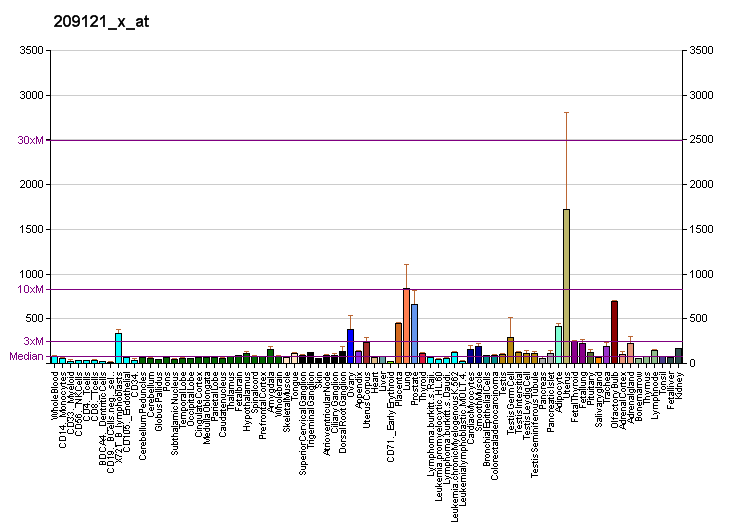

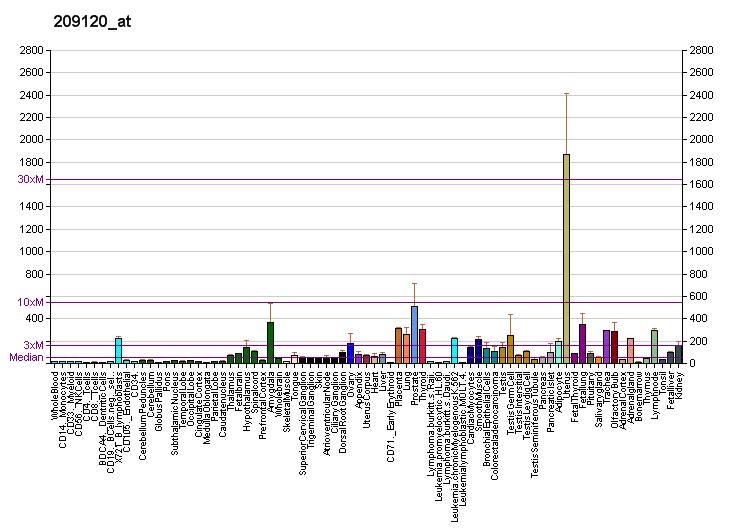

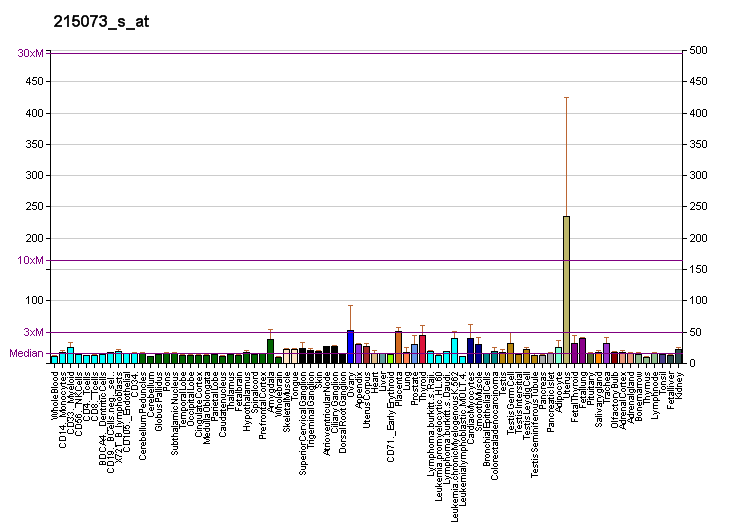
RNA expression pattern
Bgee	Human / Mouse (ortholog); Top expressed in: urethra; cardia; spinal ganglia; renal medulla; trigeminal ganglion; right ovary; stromal cell of endometrium; decidua; seminal vesicula; saphenous vein / Top expressed in: Gonadal ridge; genital tubercle; vas deferens; gastrula; stroma of kidney; ascending aorta; sciatic nerve; anterior amygdaloid area; epithelium of stomach; aortic valve; More reference expression data
BioGPS	More reference expression data
Gene ontology
Molecular function	sequence-specific DNA binding; DNA binding; retinoic acid binding; protein homodimerization activity; transcription corepressor activity; DNA-binding transcription factor activity; zinc ion binding; metal ion binding; steroid hormone receptor activity; nuclear receptor activity; protein binding; DNA-binding transcription factor activity, RNA polymerase II-specific
Cellular component	nucleus; nucleoplasm; cytosol
Biological process	trophoblast giant cell differentiation; response to estradiol; regulation of transcription, DNA-templated; blood vessel morphogenesis; negative regulation of cyclin-dependent protein serine/threonine kinase activity; lipid metabolism; regulation of transcription by RNA polymerase II; placenta blood vessel development; radial pattern formation; neuron migration; in utero embryonic development; negative regulation of transcription by RNA polymerase II; lymph vessel development; transcription, DNA-templated; negative regulation of endothelial cell migration; limb development; negative regulation of endothelial cell proliferation; positive regulation of transcription, DNA-templated; maternal placenta development; fertilization; forebrain development; negative regulation of transcription, DNA-templated; skeletal muscle tissue development; signal transduction; anterior/posterior pattern specification; steroid hormone mediated signaling pathway; intracellular receptor signaling pathway; positive regulation of systemic arterial blood pressure
Sources:Amigo / QuickGO
Orthologs
Databases	NCBI: entry; OMA: entry
Species	Human	Mouse
Entrez	7026	11819
Ensembl	ENSG00000185551	ENSMUSG00000030551
UniProt	P24468	P43135
RefSeq (mRNA)	NM_021005; NM_001145155; NM_001145156; NM_001145157	NM_009697; NM_183261
RefSeq (protein)	NP_001138627; NP_001138628; NP_001138629; NP_066285	NP_033827; NP_899084
Location (UCSC)	Chr 15: 96.33 – 96.34 Mb	Chr 7: 70 – 70.02 Mb
PubMed search
- Wikidata
View/Edit Human	View/Edit Mouse

COUP-TFII (COUP transcription factor 2), also known as NR2F2 (nuclear receptor subfamily 2, group F, member 2) is a protein that in humans is encoded by the NR2F2 gene. It functions as a pro-ovary/anti-testis transcription factor during embryonic sexual differentiation, and in particular loss-of-function mutations of the gene are associated with differences of sexual development in children with XX chromosomes, together with cardiac defects. The COUP acronym stands for chicken ovalbumin upstream promoter, which is older (pre-1999) terminology referencing the role of COUP-TFI and COUP-TFII in chickens, which were the first reported.

== Function ==
COUP-TFII plays a critical role in controlling the development of a number of tissues and organs including heart, blood vessels, muscles and limbs.

The glucocorticoid receptor (GR) stimulates COUP-TFII-induced transactivation while COUP-TFII represses the GR transcriptional activity. COUP-TFII interacts with GATA2 to inhibit adipocyte differentiation.

== Structure and ligands ==
The structure of COUP-TF2 LBD is known. Retinoic acid, although not at physiological concentrations, activate this receptor.

== Interactions ==
COUP-TFII has been shown to interact with:

- HDAC1
- Lck
- V-erbA-related gene.
- Nucleolin
