= RAR-related orphan receptor alpha =

Protein-coding gene in the species Homo sapiens

RORA
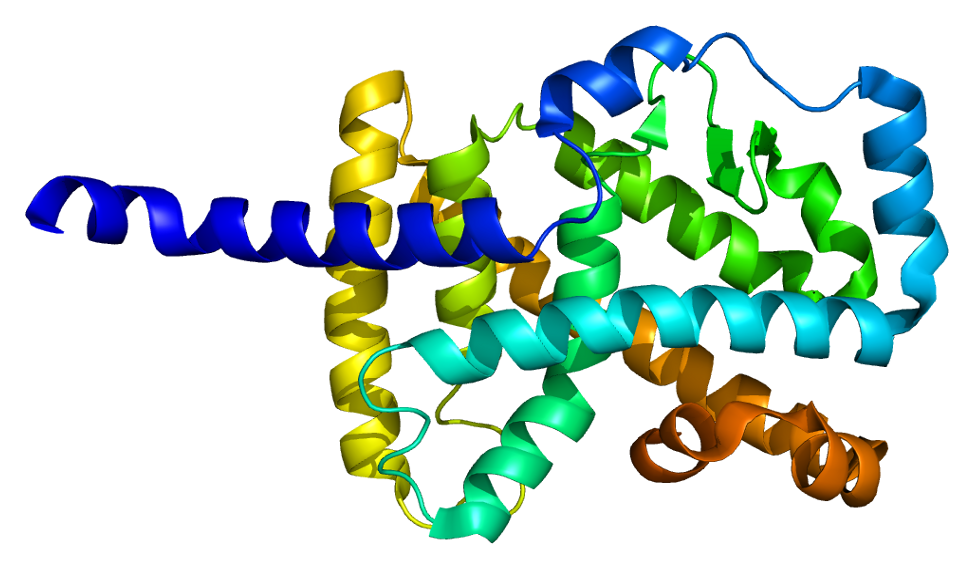

Identifiers
- Aliases: RORA, NR1F1, ROR1, ROR2, ROR3, RZR-ALPHA, RZRA, RAR related orphan receptor A, IDDECA
- External IDs: OMIM: 600825; MGI: 104661; GeneCards: RORA
Available structures
PDB	Ortholog search: PDBe RCSB
PDB	List of PDB id codes 1N83, 1S0X, 4S15

Gene location (Human)
Chr.	Chromosome 15 (human)
Band	15q22.2	Start	60,488,284 bp
Band	15q22.2	End	61,229,302 bp

Gene location (Mouse)
Chr.	Chromosome 9 (mouse)
Band	9 C|9 37.45 cM	Start	68,561,068 bp
Band	9 C|9 37.45 cM	End	69,295,528 bp
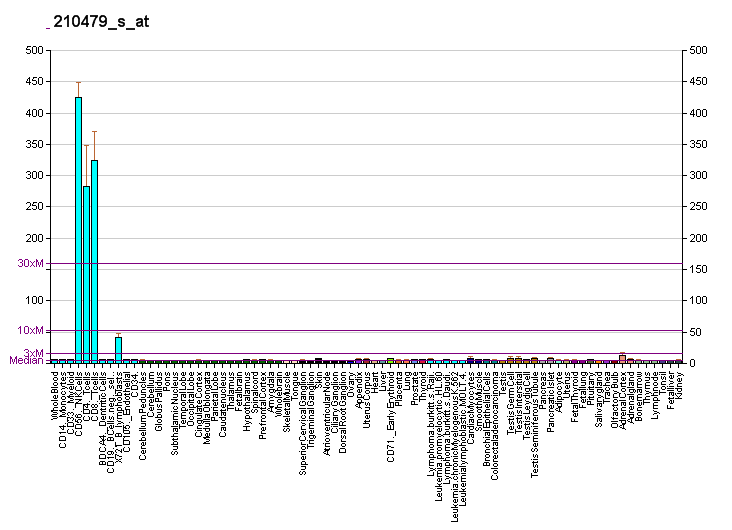

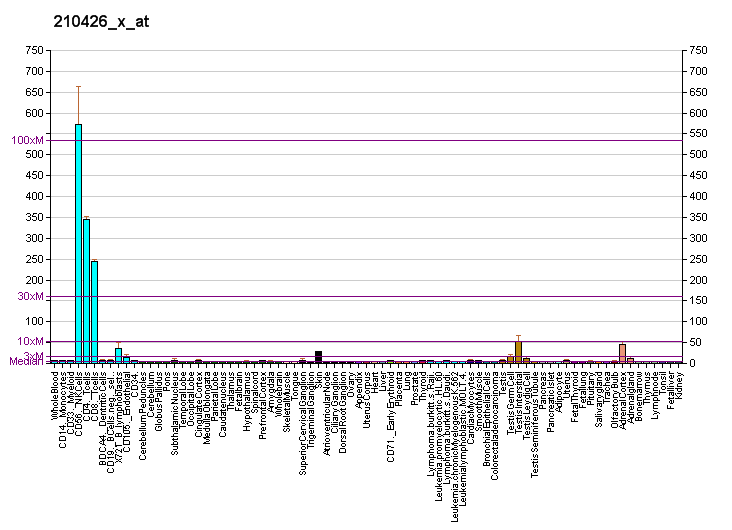
RNA expression pattern
Bgee	Human / Mouse (ortholog); Top expressed in: skin of thigh; lateral nuclear group of thalamus; skin of hip; nipple; vulva; Skeletal muscle tissue of rectus abdominis; biceps brachii; Skeletal muscle tissue of biceps brachii; skin of arm; tibia / Top expressed in: medial geniculate nucleus; medial dorsal nucleus; lateral geniculate nucleus; lobe of cerebellum; cerebellar vermis; skin of external ear; Purkinje cell; triceps brachii muscle; medial head of gastrocnemius muscle; deep cerebellar nuclei; More reference expression data
BioGPS	More reference expression data
Gene ontology
Molecular function	DNA binding; sequence-specific DNA binding; beta-catenin binding; RNA polymerase II transcription regulatory region sequence-specific DNA binding; ligand-activated transcription factor activity; DNA-binding transcription factor activity; zinc ion binding; transcription factor binding; metal ion binding; steroid hormone receptor activity; nuclear receptor activity; core promoter sequence-specific DNA binding; protein binding; transcription coactivator binding; transcription corepressor binding; oxysterol binding; DNA-binding transcription activator activity, RNA polymerase II-specific; DNA-binding transcription factor activity, RNA polymerase II-specific; RNA polymerase II cis-regulatory region sequence-specific DNA binding
Cellular component	nucleoplasm; nucleus
Biological process	negative regulation of fat cell differentiation; nitric oxide biosynthetic process; regulation of transcription, DNA-templated; cGMP metabolic process; rhythmic process; cellular response to sterol; cellular response to tumor necrosis factor; cerebellar Purkinje cell differentiation; negative regulation of I-kappaB kinase/NF-kappaB signaling; circadian regulation of gene expression; transcription, DNA-templated; cerebellar granule cell precursor proliferation; regulation of steroid metabolic process; positive regulation of transcription, DNA-templated; regulation of smoothened signaling pathway; muscle cell differentiation; intracellular receptor signaling pathway; regulation of glucose metabolic process; regulation of circadian rhythm; angiogenesis; cellular response to interleukin-1; xenobiotic metabolic process; positive regulation of circadian rhythm; positive regulation of vascular endothelial growth factor production; T-helper 17 cell differentiation; transcription initiation from RNA polymerase II promoter; negative regulation of inflammatory response; cellular response to hypoxia; triglyceride homeostasis; regulation of macrophage activation; positive regulation of transcription by RNA polymerase II; steroid hormone mediated signaling pathway; circadian rhythm; cytokine-mediated signaling pathway; cholesterol homeostasis; multicellular organism development
Sources:Amigo / QuickGO
Orthologs
Databases	NCBI: entry; OMA: entry
Species	Human	Mouse
Entrez	6095	19883
Ensembl	ENSG00000069667	ENSMUSG00000032238
UniProt	P35398	P51448
RefSeq (mRNA)	NM_002943; NM_134260; NM_134261; NM_134262	NM_013646; NM_001289916; NM_001289917
RefSeq (protein)	NP_002934; NP_599022; NP_599023; NP_599024	NP_001276845; NP_001276846; NP_038674
Location (UCSC)	Chr 15: 60.49 – 61.23 Mb	Chr 9: 68.56 – 69.3 Mb
PubMed search
- Wikidata
View/Edit Human	View/Edit Mouse

RAR-related orphan receptor alpha (RORα), also known as NR1F1 (nuclear receptor subfamily 1, group F, member 1) is a nuclear receptor that in humans is encoded by the RORA gene. RORα participates in the transcriptional regulation of some genes involved in circadian rhythm. In mice, RORα is essential for development of cerebellum through direct regulation of genes expressed in Purkinje cells. It also plays an essential role in the development of type 2 innate lymphoid cells (ILC2) and mutant animals are ILC2 deficient. In addition, although present in normal numbers, the ILC3 and Th17 cells from RORα deficient mice are defective for cytokine production.

== Discovery ==
The first three-human isoforms of RORα were initially cloned and characterized as nuclear receptors in 1994 by Giguère and colleagues, when their structure and function were first studied.

In the early 2000s, various studies demonstrated that RORα displays rhythmic patterns of expression in a circadian cycle in the liver, kidney, retina, and lung. Of interest, it was around this time that RORα abundance was found to be circadian in the mammalian suprachiasmatic nucleus. RORα is necessary for normal circadian rhythms in mice, demonstrating its importance in chronobiology.

== Structure ==
The protein encoded by this gene is a member of the NR1 subfamily of nuclear hormone receptors. In humans, 4 isoforms of RORα have been identified, which are generated via alternative splicing and promoter usage, and exhibit differential tissue-specific expression. The protein structure of RORα consists of four canonical functional groups: an N-terminal (A/B) domain, a DNA-binding domain containing two zinc fingers, a hinge domain, and a C-terminal ligand-binding domain. Within the ROR family, the DNA-binding domain is highly conserved, and the ligand-binding domain is only moderately conserved. Different isoforms of RORα have different binding specificities and strengths of transcriptional activity.

== Regulation of circadian rhythm ==
The core mammalian circadian clock is a negative feedback loop which consists of Per1/Per2, Cry1/Cry2, Bmal1, and Clock. This feedback loop is stabilized through another loop involving the transcriptional regulation of Bmal1. Transactivation of Bmal1 is regulated through the upstream ROR/REV-ERB Response Element (RRE) in the Bmal1 promoter, to which RORα and REV-ERBα bind. This stabilizing regulatory loop itself is induced by the Bmal1/Clock heterodimer, which induces transcription of RORα and REV-ERBα. RORα, which activates transcription of Bmal1, and REV-ERBα, which represses transcription of Bmal1, compete to bind to the RRE. This feedback loop regulating the expression of Bmal1 is thought to stabilize the core clock mechanism, helping to buffer it against changes in the environment.

== Mechanism ==
Specific association with ROR elements (RORE) in regulatory regions is necessary for RORα's function as a transcriptional activator. RORα achieves this by specific binding to a consensus core motif in RORE, RGGTCA. This interaction is possible through the association of RORα's first zinc finger with the core motif in the major groove, the P-box, and the association of its C-terminal extension with the AT-rich region in the 5' region of RORE.

== Homology ==
RORα, RORβ, and RORγ are all transcriptional activators recognizing ROR-response elements. ROR-alpha is expressed in a variety of cell types and is involved in regulating several aspects of development, inflammatory responses, and lymphocyte development. The RORα isoforms (RORα1 through RORα3) arise via alternative RNA processing, with RORα2 and RORα3 sharing an amino-terminal region different from RORα1. In contrast to RORα, RORβ is expressed in Central Nervous System (CNS) tissues involved in processing sensory information and in generating circadian rhythms while RORγ is critical in lymph node organogenesis and thymopoeisis.

The DNA-binding domains of the DHR3 orphan receptor in Drosophila shows especially close homology within amino and carboxy regions adjacent to the second zinc finger region in RORα, suggesting that this group of residues is important for the proteins' functionalities.

PDP1 and VRI in Drosophila regulate circadian rhythm's by competing for the same binding site, the VP box, similarly to how ROR and REV-ERB competitively bind to RRE. PDP1 and VRI constitute a feedback loop and are functional homologs of ROR and REV-ERB in mammals.

Direct orthologs of this gene have been identified in mice and humans.

Human cytochrome c pseudogene HC2 and RORα share overlapping genomic organization with the HC2 pseudogene located within the RORα2 transcription unit. The nucleotide and deduced amino acid sequences of cytochrome c-processed pseudogene are on the sense strand while those of the RORα2 amino-terminal exon are on the antisense strand.

== Interactions ==
- DNA: RORα binds to the P-box of the RORE.
- Co-activators:
  - SRC-1, CBP, p300, TRIP-l, TRIP-230, transcription intermediary protein-1 (TIF-1), peroxisome proliferator-binding protein (PBP), and GRIP-1 physically interact with RORα.
    - LXXLL motif: ROR interacts with SRC-1, GRIP-l, CBP, and p300 via the LXXLL (L=Leucine, X=any amino acid) motifs on these proteins.
- Ubiquitination: RORα is targeted for the proteasome by ubiquitination. A co-repressor, Hairless, stabilizes RORα by protecting it from this process, which also represses RORα.
- Sumoylation: UBE21/UBC9: Ubiquitin-conjugating enzyme I interacts with RORs, but its effect is not yet known.
- Phosphorylation:
  - Phosphorylation of RORα1, which inhibits its transcriptional activity, is induced by Protein Kinase C.
  - ERK2: Extracellular signal-regulated kinase-2 also phosphorylates RORα.
- ATXN1: ATXN1 and RORα form part of a protein complex in Purkinje cells.
- FOXP3: FOXP3 directly represses the transcriptional activity of RORs.
- NME1: ROR has been shown to specifically interact with NME1.
- NM23-2: NM23-2 is a nucleoside diphosphate kinase involved in organogenesis and differentiation.
- NM23-1: NM23-1 is the product of a tumor metastasis suppressor candidate gene.

== As a drug target ==
Because RORα and REV-ERBα are nuclear receptors that share the same target genes and are involved in processes that regulate metabolism, development, immunity, and circadian rhythm, they show potential as drug targets. Synthetic ligands have a variety of potential therapeutic uses, and can be used to treat diseases such as diabetes, atherosclerosis, autoimmunity, and cancer. T0901317 and SR1001, two synthetic ligands, have been found to be RORα and RORγ inverse agonists that suppress reporter activity and have been shown to delay onset and clinical severity of multiple sclerosis and other Th17 cell-mediated autoimmune diseases. SR1078 has been discovered as a RORα and RORγ agonist that increases the expression of G6PC and FGF21, yielding the therapeutic potential to treat obesity and diabetes as well as cancer of the breast, ovaries, and prostate. SR3335 has also been discovered as a RORα inverse agonist.

CGP 52608

== See also ==
- RAR-related orphan receptor
- REV-ERBα
- Aromatase deficiency
