= PGAP6 =

Protein-coding gene in the species Homo sapiens

Identifiers
- Aliases: PGAP6, M83, TMEM6, TMEM8, transmembrane protein 8A, GPI-PLA2, TMEM8A, post-glycosylphosphatidylinositol attachment to proteins 6, post-GPI attachment to proteins 6
- External IDs: MGI: 1926283; GeneCards: PGAP6
Enzyme activity
EC #	BRENDA	ExPASy	KEGG	MetaCyc
3.1.1.4	↗	↗	↗	↗

Gene location (Mouse)
Chr.	Chromosome 17 (mouse)
Band	17|17 A3.3	Start	26,332,273 bp
Band	17|17 A3.3	End	26,342,228 bp
RNA expression pattern
Bgee	Human / Mouse (ortholog); Top expressed in: body of pancreas; stromal cell of endometrium; body of stomach; blood; gallbladder; upper lobe of left lung; minor salivary glands; anterior pituitary; right lobe of liver; right lung / Top expressed in: right kidney; human kidney; granulocyte; epithelium of stomach; stroma of bone marrow; duodenum; zygote; proximal tubule; pyloric antrum; mucous cell of stomach; More reference expression data
BioGPS	n/a
Gene ontology
Molecular function	protein binding; phospholipase A2 activity; hydrolase activity; molecular function
Cellular component	integral component of membrane; integral component of plasma membrane; extracellular exosome; membrane; lysosome; lysosomal membrane; plasma membrane
Biological process	cell adhesion; biological process
Sources:Amigo / QuickGO
Orthologs
Databases	NCBI: entry
Species	Human	Mouse
Entrez	58986	60455
Ensembl	n/a	ENSMUSG00000024180
UniProt	Q9HCN3	Q9ESN3
RefSeq (mRNA)	NM_021259	NM_021793
RefSeq (protein)	NP_067082	NP_068565
Location (UCSC)	n/a	Chr 17: 26.33 – 26.34 Mb
PubMed search
- Wikidata
View/Edit Human	View/Edit Mouse

Post-GPI attachment to proteins factor 6 is an enzyme that in humans is encoded by the PGAP6 gene (previously TMEM8A). The PGAP6 protein that acts as a phospholipase A2 as part of the GPI-anchor maturation process.

== Gene ==
=== Locus ===
The human gene TMEM8A is found on chromosome 16 at the band 16p13.3.

The span of this gene on chromosome 16 spans from base pair 420,773 to 437,113 making this gene 16,340 base pairs in length. This gene is found on the minus strand of the chromosome. There are no known isoforms.

=== Aliases ===
TMEM8A is also known as Transmembrane protein 8A, Transmembrane Protein 6, Five-Span Transmembrane Protein M83, TMEM6, TMEM8, Transmembrane protein 8 and M83.

== Homology ==
=== Paralogs ===
There are two paralogs for TMEM8A found in humans, C9orf127 and TMEM8C. Both of these paralogs are found on Chromosome 9.

=== Orthologs ===
The ortholog space of TMEM8A is fairly narrow, with the majority of orthologs found in mammals and in particular primates with only a few exceptions.

Genus and species	Common name	Class	Accession	Percent identity
Pan troglodytes	Chimpanzee	Mammalia	XP_510709	99%
Pongo abelii	Orangutan	Mammalia	XP_002825960	97%
Macaca mulatta	Rhesus monkey	Mammalia	XP_001118461	93%
Callithrix jacchus	Marmoset	Mammalia	ABZ80344	93%
Rattus norvegicus	Rat	Mammalia	XP_001070176	43%
Bos taurus	Cow	Mammalia	NP_001092377	69%
Ailuropoda melanoleuca	Panda	Mammalia	EFB17134	78%
Canis familiaris	Dog	Mammalia	XP_003639163	74%
Equus caballus	Horse	Mammalia	XP_001915452	78%
Felis catus	Cat	Mammalia	XP_003999121	75%
Monodelphis domestica	Opossum	Mammalia	XP_001378110	44%
Ornithorhynchus anatinus	Platypus	Mammalia	XP_001512398	50%
Gallus gallus	Chicken	Aves	XP_003643243	56%
Anolis carolinensis	Lizard	Reptilia	XP_003230229	53%
Xenopus tropicalis	Frog	Amphibia	XP_002943473	43%
Takifugo rubripes	Pufferfish	Actinopterygii	XP_003975883	44%
Danio rerio	Zebrafish	Acrinoptergii	XP_00139040	44%
Strongylacentrotus putputatus	Sea urchin	Echinoidea	XP_795452	29%
Drosophila melanogaster	Fruit fly	Insecta	NP_651350	36%

== Protein ==
=== Primary sequence ===
The gene encodes a protein also called TMEM8A. This protein in 771 amino acids in length but has been shown to have a signal peptide from amino acid 1 to 34; the mature form of the protein is only 737 amino acids in length. The precursor form with signal peptide intact has a molecular weight of 84.780 kilodaltons and the mature form with the signal peptide cleaved has a molecular weight of 81.624 kilodaltons TMEM8A has an isoelectric point of the mature form of pI=7.3.

=== Domains and motifs ===
TMEM8A is a transmembrane protein with five transmembrane domains, making it one of only three proteins found in the human body with five domains; the other two are CD47 and AC133. The protein also contains an EGF-like domain, which is a sequence of about thirty to forty amino-acid residues, found in the sequence of epidermal growth factor (EGF), that has been shown to be present in a more or less conserved form in a large number of other, mostly animal, proteins. The functional significance of EGF domains in what appear to be unrelated proteins is not yet clear. However, a common feature is that these repeats are found in the extracellular domain of membrane-bound proteins or in proteins known to be secreted. The EGF domain includes six cysteine residues which have been shown (in EGF) to be involved in disulphide bonds. The main structure is a two-stranded beta-sheet followed by a loop to a short C-terminal two-stranded sheet. Subdomains between the conserved cysteines vary in length.

=== Post-translational modifications ===
The protein has been shown to undergo glycosylation post-translationally at amino acids 144, 407, and 431. There are also three disulfide bonds between amino acid 498 and 508, 502 and 521, and 523 and 532. These disulfide bonds are all characteristic of proteins with an EGF-like domain.

== Expression ==
=== Expression ===
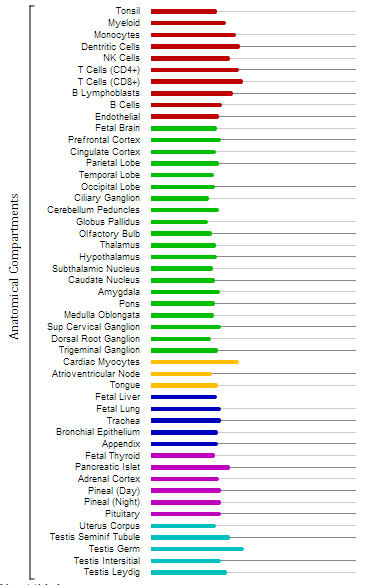

TMEM8A is found to be expressed ubiquitously throughout the human body; however, it has been shown to be downregulated during CD4+ and CD8+ T-cell activation.

=== Transcript variants ===
There are three natural transcript variants of TMEM8A. One is located at amino acid 136 where a threonine is swapped for an alanine. Another is present at amino acid 310 where an isoleucine is swapped for a valine and one at amino acid 567 where an arginine is swapped for a tryptophan. None of these variants result in a change of expression nor any loss/gain of function mutations.

== Interacting proteins ==
=== Transcription factors ===
There are many predicted transcription factor binding sites in the TMEM8A promoter. Below is a table of the best possibilities, which have high confidence values, evolutionary conservation, and/or multiple possible binding sites in the promoter.

Transcription factor	Start	End	Strand	Sequence
Insulimoma associated factors	1	13	+	tggagGGGGtccg
Plemorphic adenoma gene 1	3	25	+	gaGGGGgtccgggtggcagtgcg
Hypermethylated in cancer 1	11	23	-	cacTGCCacccgg
Zinc finger with KRAB and SCAN domains 3	15	37	-	gccatCCCCacccgcactgccac
Glial cells missing homolog 1	18	32	+	ccccaCCCGcactgc
Basic krueppel-like factor (KLF3)	19	35	+	cagtgcGGGTggggatg
Zinc finger protein Spalt-2, sal-like 2, p150(sal2)	23	33	+	gcgggtGGGGatg
MYC-associated zinc finger protein related transcription factor	23	35	+	gcgggtGGGGatg
Myeloid zinc finger protein MZF1	27	37	+	gtGGGGatggc
Hypermethylated in cancer 1	29	41	-	gacTGCCatcccc
Yin and Yang 1 activator sites	38	60	-	gacactgCCATcgccactctgact
Y box binding protein 1, has a preference for binding ssDNA	41	53	+	cagagTGGCgatg
Glial cells missing homolog 1	54	68	-	cgccaCCCGcactgc
Wilms Tumor Suppressor	71	84	+	ggcagtgTGGGtggcga
Runt-related transcription factor 2 / CBFA1 (core-binding factor, runt domain, alpha subunit 1)	73	87	+	cagtGTGGgtggcga
GLI-Kruppel family member GLI3	74	88	-	atcgCCACccacact
Zinc finger with KRAB and SCAN domains 3	87	103	-	gccatCCCCacccgcactgccat

=== Interactions ===
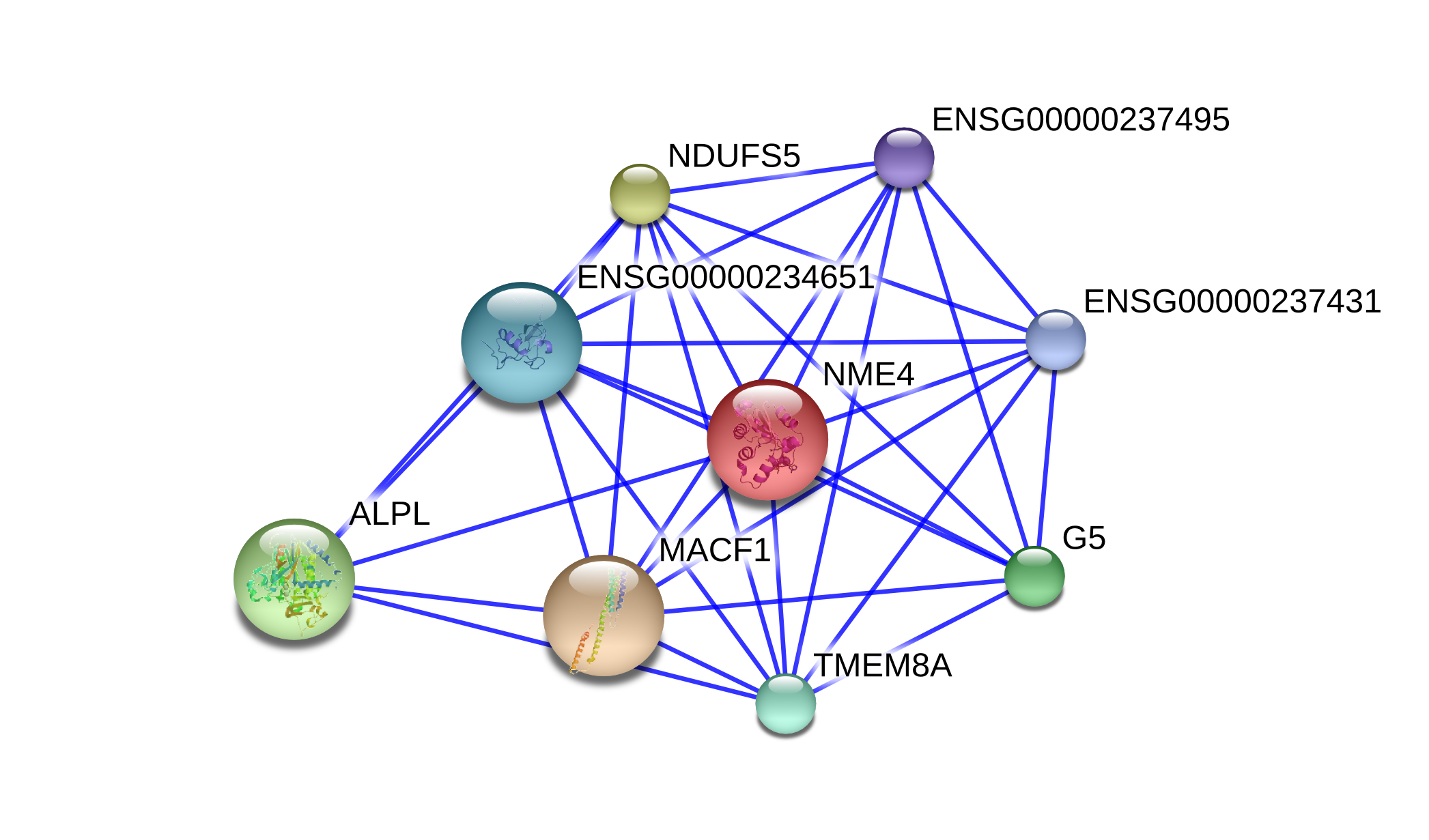
Protein Interaction Network for TMEM8A

TMEM8A has been shown to interact with the following proteins

- ALPL
- NDUFS5
- NME4
- MACF1
- G5
- ENSG00000234651
- ENSG00000237431
- ENSG00000237495
