= RAR-related orphan receptor =

Members of the nuclear receptor family of intracellular transcription factors

RAR-related orphan receptor A (alpha)

Identifiers
- Symbol: RORA
- Alt. symbols: RZRA, ROR1, ROR2, ROR3, NR1F1
- NCBI gene: 6095
- HGNC: 10258
- OMIM: 600825
- PDB: 1N83
- RefSeq: NM_002943
- UniProt: P35398

Other data
- Locus: Chr. 15 q21-q22
Search for
- Structures: Swiss-model
- Domains: InterPro

RAR-related orphan receptor B (beta)

Identifiers
- Symbol: RORB
- Alt. symbols: RZRB, NR1F2, ROR-BETA
- NCBI gene: 6096
- HGNC: 10259
- OMIM: 601972
- PDB: 1NQ7
- RefSeq: NM_006914
- UniProt: Q92753

Other data
- Locus: Chr. 9 q22
Search for
- Structures: Swiss-model
- Domains: InterPro

RAR-related orphan receptor C (gamma)

Identifiers
- Symbol: RORC
- Alt. symbols: RZRG, RORG, NR1F3, TOR
- NCBI gene: 6097
- HGNC: 10260
- OMIM: 602943
- RefSeq: NM_005060
- UniProt: P51449

Other data
- Locus: Chr. 1 q21
Search for
- Structures: Swiss-model
- Domains: InterPro

The RAR-related orphan receptors (RORs) are members of the nuclear receptor family of intracellular transcription factors. There are three forms of ROR, ROR-α, -β, and -γ and each is encoded by a separate gene, RORA, RORB, and RORC respectively. The RORs are somewhat unusual in that they appear to bind as monomers to hormone response elements as opposed to the majority of other nuclear receptors which bind as dimers. They bind to DNA elements called ROR response elements (RORE).

== Ligands ==
While the identity of natural ligands for the RORs remains controversial, similar to the liver X receptors (LXRs), it appears that the RORs are activated by oxysterols. Furthermore, the RORs appear to be constitutively active (absence of ligand) and that activity may be due to continuously bound natural ligands. Side chain oxygenated sterols (e.g., 20α-hydroxycholesterol, 22R-hydroxycholesterol, and 25-hydroxycholesterol) are high affinity RORγ agonists while sterols oxygenated at the 7-position, (e.g., (7-hydroxycholesterol and 7-ketocholesterol) function as inverse agonists for both RORa and RORγ. A number of other natural substances have also been reported to bind to the RORs. These include all-trans retinoic acid binds with high affinity to ROR-β and -γ but not ROR-α. Finally the RORs may function as lipid sensors and hence may play a role in the regulation of lipid metabolism.

Melatonin has been claimed to be an endogenous ligand for ROR-α while CGP 52608 has been identified as a ROR-α selective synthetic ligand.

== Tissue distribution ==
RORα, RORβ, and RORγ are primarily expressed the following tissues:

- ROR-α – widely expressed in liver, skeletal muscle, skin, lung, adipose tissue, kidney, thymus, and brain.
- ROR-β – expression restricted to the brain and retina.
- ROR-γ – highly expressed in thymus (the thymus-specific isoform is referred to as RORγt), muscle, testis, pancreas, prostate, heart, and liver.

== Function ==
The three forms of RORs fulfill a number of critical roles including:

- ROR-α – Involved in the maintenance of the circadian rhythm by positively regulating the expression of BMAL1. Development of the cerebellum and lymph nodes, lipid metabolism, immune response, maintenance of bone.
- ROR-β – Circadian rhythm, bone metabolism, and retinal neurogenesis.
- ROR-γ – Lymph node development and immune response, survival of T helper 17 cells.

== As drug targets ==
A number of synthetic RORγt inverse agonists are in various stages of drug development for the treatment of inflammatory diseases. RORγt agonists have also been proposed for use as immunooncology agents to activate the immune system to treat cancer.

== See also ==
- Retinoid receptor
