= NME4 =

Protein-coding gene in the species Homo sapiens

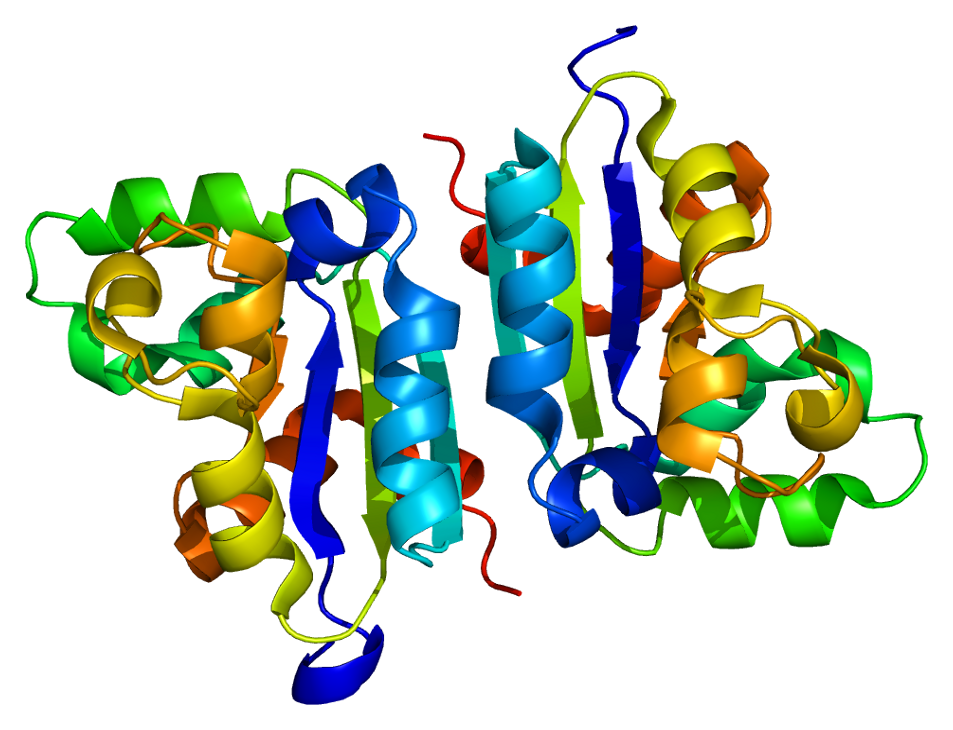

Identifiers
- Aliases: NME4, NDPK-D, NM23H4, nm23-H4, NME/NM23 nucleoside diphosphate kinase 4
- External IDs: OMIM: 601818; MGI: 1931148; GeneCards: NME4
Available structures
PDB	Ortholog search: PDBe RCSB
PDB	List of PDB id codes 1EHW
Enzyme activity
EC #	BRENDA	ExPASy	KEGG	MetaCyc
2.7.4.6	↗	↗	↗	↗

Gene location (Human)
Chr.	Chromosome 16 (human)
Band	16p13.3	Start	396,725 bp
Band	16p13.3	End	410,367 bp

Gene location (Mouse)
Chr.	Chromosome 17 (mouse)
Band	17|17 A3.3	Start	26,310,708 bp
Band	17|17 A3.3	End	26,314,576 bp
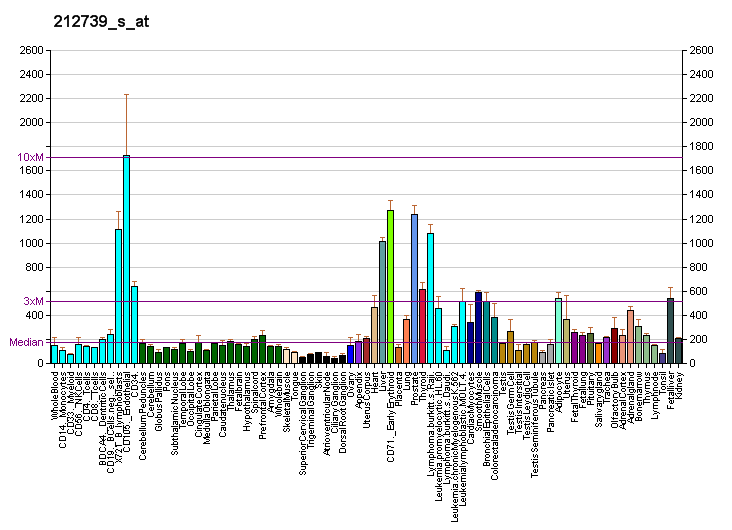
RNA expression pattern
Bgee	Human / Mouse (ortholog); Top expressed in: stromal cell of endometrium; muscle layer of sigmoid colon; right adrenal cortex; gastric mucosa; left adrenal cortex; saphenous vein; ventricular zone; left uterine tube; left coronary artery; right lobe of liver / Top expressed in: embryo; embryo; epiblast; ventricular zone; genital tubercle; tail of embryo; yolk sac; maxillary prominence; mandibular prominence; fetal liver hematopoietic progenitor cell; More reference expression data
BioGPS	More reference expression data
Gene ontology
Molecular function	metal ion binding; lipid binding; nucleotide binding; transferase activity; kinase activity; ATP binding; protein binding; nucleoside diphosphate kinase activity; cardiolipin binding
Cellular component	mitochondrial matrix; membrane; mitochondrial inner membrane; mitochondrion; intracellular anatomical structure; mitochondrial intermembrane space
Biological process	nucleobase-containing small molecule interconversion; nucleoside metabolic process; nucleoside diphosphate phosphorylation; GTP biosynthetic process; UTP biosynthetic process; CTP biosynthetic process; nucleotide metabolic process; phosphorylation; regulation of apoptotic process; lipid transport
Sources:Amigo / QuickGO
Orthologs
Databases	NCBI: entry; OMA: entry
Species	Human	Mouse
Entrez	4833	56520
Ensembl	ENSG00000103202	ENSMUSG00000024177
UniProt	O00746	Q9WV84
RefSeq (mRNA)	NM_005009; NM_001286433; NM_001286435; NM_001286436; NM_001286438 NM_001286439; NM_001286440	NM_019731
RefSeq (protein)	NP_001273362; NP_001273364; NP_001273365; NP_001273367; NP_001273368 NP_001273369; NP_005000	NP_062705
Location (UCSC)	Chr 16: 0.4 – 0.41 Mb	Chr 17: 26.31 – 26.31 Mb
PubMed search
- Wikidata
View/Edit Human	View/Edit Mouse

Non-metastatic cells 4, protein expressed in, also known as NME4, is a protein which in humans is encoded by the NME4 gene.

== Function ==
The nucleoside diphosphate (NDP) kinases (EC 2.7.4.6) are ubiquitous enzymes that catalyze transfer of gamma-phosphates, via a phosphohistidine intermediate, between nucleoside and dioxynucleoside tri- and diphosphates. The enzymes are products of the nm23 gene family, which includes NME4. The first nm23 gene, nm23-H1 (NME1), was isolated based on its reduced expression in a highly metastatic murine melanoma cell line and was proposed to be a metastasis suppressing gene. The human equivalent was obtained by cDNA library screening using the murine gene as a probe and found to be homologous to the Drosophila awd gene. A second human gene, nm23-H2 (NME2), encoding a protein 88% identical to nm23-H1, was subsequently isolated. Both genes were localized on 17q21.3 and their gene products were formerly identified as the A and B subunits of NDP kinases. In mammals, functional NDP kinases are heterohexamers of the A and B monomers, which can combine at variable ratios to form different types of hybrids. These enzymes are highly expressed in tumors as compared with normal tissues. In some cell lines and in certain solid tumors, decreased expression of NME1 is associated with increased metastatic potential; moreover, when transfected into very aggressive cell lines, such as human breast carcinoma, NME1 decreased the metastatic potential. A third human gene, DR-nm23 (NME3), was identified and found to share high sequence similarity with the NME1 and NME2 genes. It is highly expressed in blast crisis transition of chronic myeloid leukemia. When overexpressed by transfection, NME3 suppressed granulocyte differentiation and induced apoptosis of myeloid precursor cells.
