= RORC =

RORC may refer to:

- RAR-related orphan receptor gamma, encoded by the RORC gene
- Royal Ocean Racing Club
- Russian Orthodox Old-Rite Church
