= OR2A12 =

Protein-coding gene in the species Homo sapiens

Identifiers
- Aliases: OR2A12, OR2A12P, OR2A16P, olfactory receptor family 2 subfamily A member 12
- External IDs: MGI: 3030280; GeneCards: OR2A12

Gene location (Human)
Chr.	Chromosome 7 (human)
Band	7q35	Start	144,086,278 bp
Band	7q35	End	144,098,953 bp

Gene location (Mouse)
Chr.	Chromosome 6 (mouse)
Band	6|6 B2.1	Start	42,898,311 bp
Band	6|6 B2.1	End	42,908,075 bp
RNA expression pattern
Bgee	Human / Mouse (ortholog); Top expressed in: testicle / n/a; More reference expression data
BioGPS	n/a
Gene ontology
Molecular function	signal transducer activity; olfactory receptor activity; G protein-coupled receptor activity
Cellular component	plasma membrane; membrane; integral component of membrane
Biological process	sensory perception of smell; signal transduction; response to stimulus; detection of chemical stimulus involved in sensory perception of smell; G protein-coupled receptor signaling pathway
Sources:Amigo / QuickGO
Orthologs
Databases	NCBI: entry; OMA: entry
Species	Human	Mouse
Entrez	346525	258292
Ensembl	ENSG00000221858; ENSG00000284949	ENSMUSG00000073111
UniProt	Q8NGT7	Q8VEV0
RefSeq (mRNA)	NM_001004135	NM_146295
RefSeq (protein)	NP_001004135	NP_666407
Location (UCSC)	Chr 7: 144.09 – 144.1 Mb	Chr 6: 42.9 – 42.91 Mb
PubMed search
- Wikidata
View/Edit Human	View/Edit Mouse

Olfactory receptor 2A12 is a protein that in humans is encoded by the OR2A12 gene.

Olfactory receptors interact with odorant molecules in the nose, to initiate a neuronal response that triggers the perception of a smell. The olfactory receptor proteins are members of a large family of G-protein-coupled receptors (GPCR) arising from single coding-exon genes. Olfactory receptors share a 7-transmembrane domain structure with many neurotransmitter and hormone receptors and are responsible for the recognition and G protein-mediated transduction of odorant signals. The olfactory receptor gene family is the largest in the genome. The nomenclature assigned to the olfactory receptor genes and proteins for this organism is independent of other organisms.

== See also ==
- Olfactory receptor
