= OR6C75 =

Protein-coding gene in the species Homo sapiens

Identifiers
- Aliases: OR6C75, olfactory receptor family 6 subfamily C member 75
- External IDs: MGI: 3030624; GeneCards: OR6C75

Gene location (Human)
Chr.	Chromosome 12 (human)
Band	12q13.2	Start	55,362,975 bp
Band	12q13.2	End	55,369,279 bp

Gene location (Mouse)
Chr.	Chromosome 10 (mouse)
Band	10|10 D3	Start	129,334,361 bp
Band	10|10 D3	End	129,339,211 bp
RNA expression pattern
Bgee	Human / Mouse (ortholog); Top expressed in: gonad; sural nerve; ventricular zone / n/a; More reference expression data
BioGPS	n/a
Gene ontology
Molecular function	G protein-coupled receptor activity; olfactory receptor activity; signal transducer activity
Cellular component	integral component of membrane; plasma membrane; membrane
Biological process	sensory perception of smell; detection of chemical stimulus involved in sensory perception of smell; signal transduction; response to stimulus; G protein-coupled receptor signaling pathway
Sources:Amigo / QuickGO
Orthologs
Databases	NCBI: entry; OMA: entry
Species	Human	Mouse
Entrez	390323	258935
Ensembl	ENSG00000187857	ENSMUSG00000044025
UniProt	A6NL08	Q8VGJ3
RefSeq (mRNA)	NM_001005497	NM_146933
RefSeq (protein)	NP_001005497	NP_667144
Location (UCSC)	Chr 12: 55.36 – 55.37 Mb	Chr 10: 129.33 – 129.34 Mb
PubMed search
- Wikidata
View/Edit Human	View/Edit Mouse

Olfactory receptor, family 6, subfamily C, member 75 is a protein in humans that is encoded by the OR6C75 gene.

Olfactory receptors interact with odorant molecules in the nose to initiate a neuronal response that triggers the perception of a smell. The olfactory receptor proteins are members of a large family of G-protein-coupled receptors (GPCR) arising from single coding-exon genes. Olfactory receptors share a 7-transmembrane domain structure with many neurotransmitter receptors and hormone receptors and are responsible for the recognition and G protein-mediated transduction of odorant signals. The olfactory receptor gene family is the largest in the genome. The nomenclature assigned to the olfactory receptor genes and proteins for this organism is independent of other organisms.
