= Shantanu Chowdhury =

Indian structural biologist (born 1968)

- Born: 9 September 1968 (age 57); West Bengal, India
- Education: Jadavpur University; Indian Institute of Chemical Technology; University of Nebraska–Lincoln; Max Planck Institute for Terrestrial Microbiology
- Known for: Studies on Gene regulation
- Awards: 2010 National Bioscience Award for Career Development; 2011 CDRI Award; 2012 Shanti Swarup Bhatnagar Prize
- Scientific career
- Fields: Genomics; Structural biology
- Workplaces: Insilico Sciences; Institute of Genomics and Integrative Biology

Shantanu Chowdhury (born 1968) is an Indian structural biologist and a professor at Institute of Genomics and Integrative Biology of the Council of Scientific and Industrial Research. He is known for developing a mechanism for gene regulation mediated by DNA Secondary-Structure in diverse cellular contexts. An elected fellow of the National Academy of Sciences, India, he is a recipient of the National Bioscience Award for Career Development of the Department of Biotechnology in 2010. The Council of Scientific and Industrial Research, the apex agency of the Government of India for scientific research, awarded him the Shanti Swarup Bhatnagar Prize for Science and Technology, one of the highest Indian science awards, in 2012, for his contributions to biological sciences.

== Biography ==
Shantanu Chowdhury, born on 9 September 1968 in the Indian state of West Bengal, completed his master's degree in chemistry at Jadavpur University, Kolkata before securing a PhD from the Indian Institute of Chemical Technology, Hyderabad in 1998. His post-doctoral studies were at the department of biochemistry of University of Nebraska–Lincoln and later at Max Planck Institute for Terrestrial Microbiology. He returned to India in 2001 and joined Insilico Sciences, Bangalore but his tenure there lasted only one year. His next move was to Institute of Genomics and Integrative Biology (IGIB) as a scientist in 2002 where he serves as a professor of functional genomics.

Chowdhury established his own laboratory at IGIB and his team is involved in researches in functional genomics. The group focuses its studies on the control of NME2, a metastasis suppressor, on telomerase function and the biological action of DNA secondary structures like G-quadruplex. He and his colleagues are reported to have developed a new mechanism for gene regulation and elucidated the process of gene transcription involving G-quadruplex. His researches have been published in a number of articles (Note: Please see Selected bibliography section) and PubMed, an online repository of scientific articles, has listed several of them. He is a member of the scientific advisory board of Bionivid, a Bengaluru-based information technology company involved in microarray data analytics and sequencing. and has delivered keynote addresses which included the discourse on Engineering Reversal of Drug Resistance in Cancer Cells at the Drug Discovery India 2016 conference held in Bengaluru in September 2016 and the address on The Emerging Story of DNA Quadruplexes in Genetic and Epigenetic Regulation at Asian Epigenomics 2016. He sits on the editorial boards of two science journals, Human Genomics and Journal of Biological Chemistry and has served as a peer-reviewer for JBC and PLOS Computational Biology.

== Awards and honors ==
In 2007, Chowdhury received the Swarnajayanthi Fellowship of the Department of Biotechnology (DBT) and three years later, DBT honored him again with the 2010 National Bioscience Award for Career Development. The Central Drug Research Institute awarded him the Excellence in Drug Research Award for Life Sciences category in 2011 and he also received the Wellcome Trust-DBT Fellowship the same year. He was awarded the Shanti Swarup Bhatnagar Prize for Science and Technology, one of the highest Indian science awards, by the Council of Scientific and Industrial Research the next year. He was also elected as a fellow by the National Academy of Sciences, India in 2012. Chemical & Engineering News magazine of the American Chemical Society featured his researches twice, in 2007 and in 2009, citing their relevance as future drug targets.

== Selected bibliography ==
- Thakur RK, Kumar P, Halder K, Verma A, Kar A, Parent JL, Basundra R, Kumar A, Chowdhury S (January 2009). "Metastases suppressor NM23-H2 interaction with G-quadruplex DNA within c-MYC promoter nuclease hypersensitive element induces c-MYC expression". Nucleic Acids Res. 37 (1): 172–83. doi:10.1093/nar/gkn919. PMC 2615625. PMID 19033359.
- Halder K, Chowdhury S (December 2007). "Quadruplex-coupled kinetics distinguishes ligand binding between G4 DNA motifs". Biochemistry. 46 (51): 14762–70. doi:10.1021/bi701590z. PMID 18052204.
- Mani P1 Yadav VK, Das SK, Chowdhury S. (2009). "Genome-wide analyses of recombination prone regions predict role of DNA structural motif in recombination". PLOS ONE. 4 (2) e4399. Bibcode:2009PLoSO...4.4399M. doi:10.1371/journal.pone.0004399. PMC 2635932. PMID 19198658.
- Halder K, Halder R, Chowdhury S (December 2009). "Genome-wide analysis predicts DNA structural motifs as nucleosome exclusion signals". Mol. Biosyst. 5 (12): 1703–12. doi:10.1039/b905132e. PMID 19587895.
- Verma A, Halder K, Halder R, Yadav VK, Rawal P, Thakur RK, Mohd F, Sharma A, Chowdhury S (September 2008). "Genome-wide computational and expression analyses reveal G-quadruplex DNA motifs as conserved cis-regulatory elements in human and related species". J Med Chem. 51 (18): 5641–9. doi:10.1021/jm800448a. PMID 18767830.
- Rawal P, Kummarasetti VB, Ravindran J, Kumar N, Halder K, Sharma R, Mukerji M, Das SK, Chowdhury S (May 2006). "Genome-wide prediction of G4 DNA as regulatory motifs: role in Escherichia coli global regulation". Genome Res. 16 (5): 644–55. doi:10.1101/gr.4508806. PMC 1457047. PMID 16651665.

== See also ==
- Functional genomics
- NME2
- G-quadruplex
