= HERC5 =

Protein-coding gene in the species Homo sapiens

Identifiers
- Aliases: HERC5, CEB1, CEBP1, HECT and RLD domain containing E3 ubiquitin protein ligase 5
- External IDs: OMIM: 608242; GeneCards: HERC5

Gene location (Human)
Chr.	Chromosome 4 (human)
Band	4q22.1	Start	88,457,119 bp
Band	4q22.1	End	88,506,163 bp
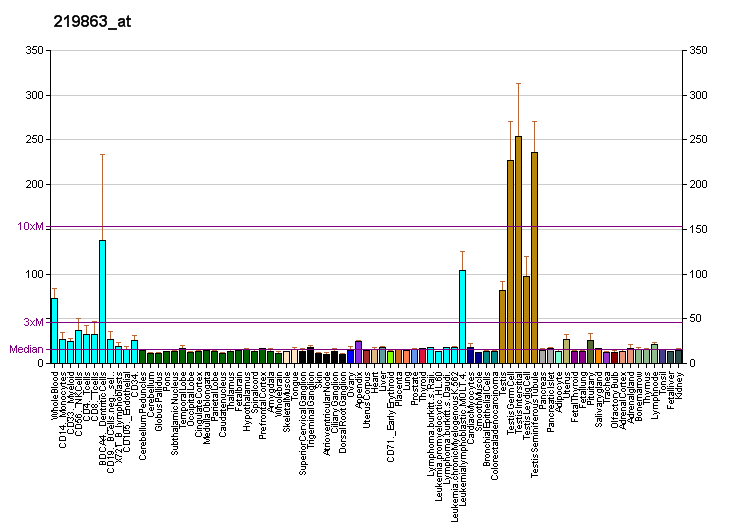
RNA expression pattern
Bgee	Human / Mouse (ortholog); Top expressed in: gonad; testicle; right testis; sperm; left testis; germinal epithelium; monocyte; palpebral conjunctiva; body of uterus; left ovary / n/a; More reference expression data
BioGPS	More reference expression data
Gene ontology
Molecular function	ISG15 transferase activity; protein binding; transferase activity; RNA binding; ubiquitin-protein transferase activity; ubiquitin protein ligase activity
Cellular component	perinuclear region of cytoplasm; cytosol; cytoplasm
Biological process	ISG15-protein conjugation; negative regulation of type I interferon production; regulation of cyclin-dependent protein serine/threonine kinase activity; regulation of defense response to virus; defense response to virus; immune system process; protein polyubiquitination; innate immune response
Sources:Amigo / QuickGO
Orthologs
Databases	NCBI: entry; OMA: entry
Species	Human	Mouse
Entrez	51191	n/a
Ensembl	ENSG00000138646	n/a
UniProt	Q9UII4	n/a
RefSeq (mRNA)	NM_016323	n/a
RefSeq (protein)	NP_057407	n/a
Location (UCSC)	Chr 4: 88.46 – 88.51 Mb	n/a
PubMed search		n/a
- Wikidata
View/Edit Human

E3 ISG15–protein ligase HERC5 is an enzyme that in humans is encoded by the HERC5 gene.

This gene is a member of the HERC family of ubiquitin ligases and encodes a protein with a HECT domain and five RCC1 repeats. Pro-inflammatory cytokines upregulate expression of this gene in endothelial cells. The protein localizes to the cytoplasm and perinuclear region and functions as an interferon-induced E3 protein ligase that mediates ISGylation of protein targets. The gene lies in a cluster of HERC family genes on chromosome 4. HERC5 has been shown to exhibit antiviral activity towards HIV-1, influenza A virus and human papillomavirus.

== Interactions ==
HERC5 has been shown to interact with NME2 and Cyclin E1.
