= Cintirorgon =

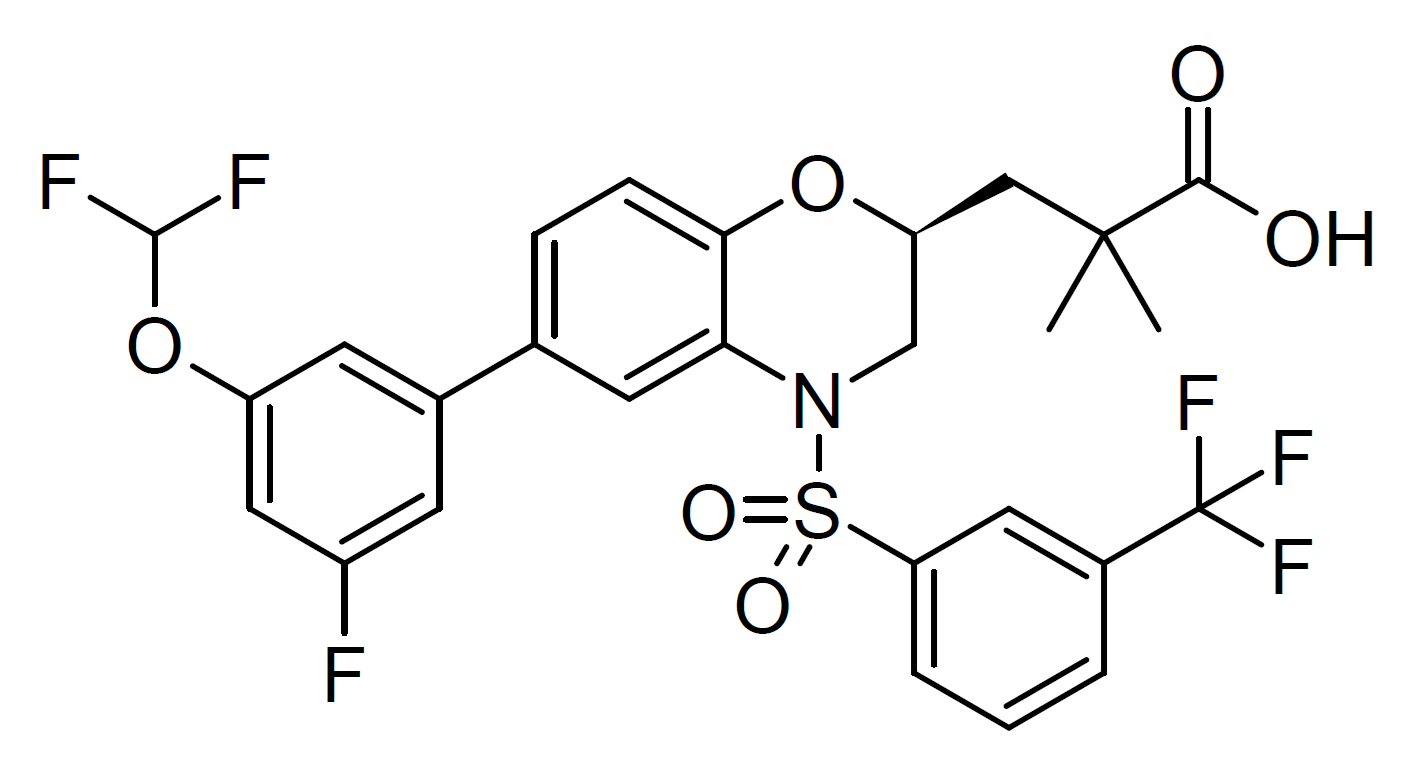

Clinical data
- Other names: LYC-55716
- Drug class: RORγ agonist

Identifiers
- IUPAC name: 3-[(2S)-6-[3-(difluoromethoxy)-5-fluorophenyl]-4-[3-(trifluoromethyl)phenyl]sulfonyl-2,3-dihydro-1,4-benzoxazin-2-yl]-2,2-dimethylpropanoic acid
- CAS Number: 2055536-64-4
- PubChem CID: 124126348
- IUPHAR/BPS: 10045
- DrugBank: DB20916
- ChemSpider: 67896554
- UNII: LPN433P0EA
- ChEMBL: ChEMBL4472508

Chemical and physical data
- Formula: C_{27}H_{23}F_{6}NO_{6}S
- Molar mass: 603.53 g·mol^{−1}
- 3D model (JSmol): Interactive image
- SMILES: CC(C)(C[C@H]1CN(C2=C(O1)C=CC(=C2)C3=CC(=CC(=C3)F)OC(F)F)S(=O)(=O)C4=CC=CC(=C4)C(F)(F)F)C(=O)O
- InChI: InChI=1S/C27H23F6NO6S/c1-26(2,24(35)36)13-20-14-34(41(37,38)21-5-3-4-17(11-21)27(31,32)33)22-10-15(6-7-23(22)39-20)16-8-18(28)12-19(9-16)40-25(29)30/h3-12,20,25H,13-14H2,1-2H3,(H,35,36)/t20-/m0/s1; Key:GULSIMHVQYBADX-FQEVSTJZSA-N

Cintirorgon (LYC-55716) is a drug which acts as a selective agonist of the receptor RAR-related orphan receptor gamma (RORγ). It was developed for the treatment of certain forms of cancer and is in early stage human clinical trials.
