= GSK2981278 =

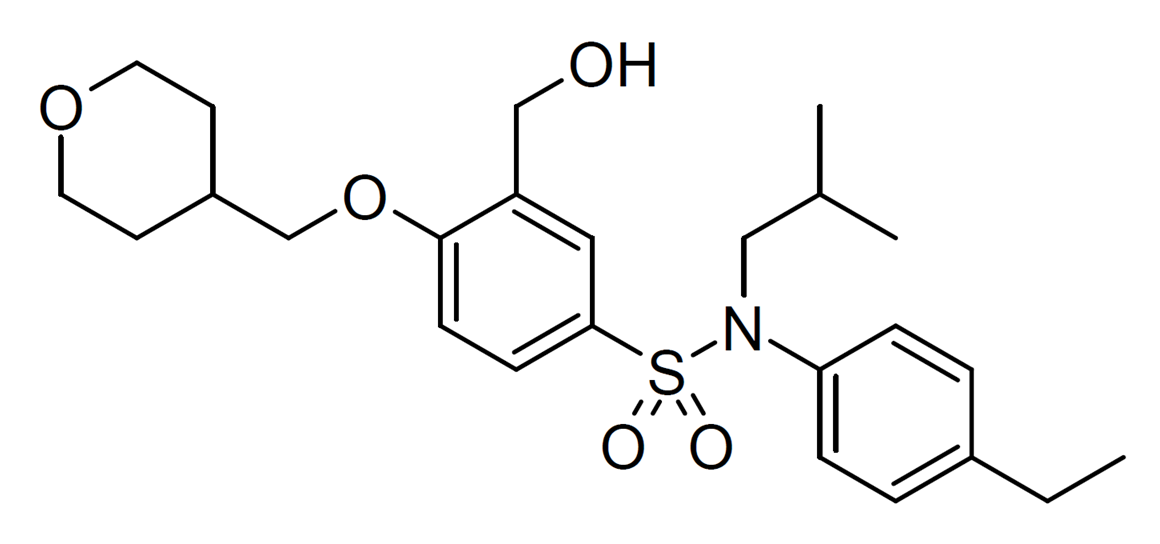

Clinical data
- Drug class: RORγ agonist

Identifiers
- IUPAC name: N-(4-ethylphenyl)-3-(hydroxymethyl)-N-(2-methylpropyl)-4-(oxan-4-ylmethoxy)benzenesulfonamide
- CAS Number: 1474110-21-8
- PubChem CID: 89875987
- IUPHAR/BPS: 9661
- DrugBank: DB16319
- ChemSpider: 39625826
- UNII: L49V5G013I
- ChEMBL: ChEMBL4225088

Chemical and physical data
- Formula: C_{25}H_{35}NO_{5}S
- Molar mass: 461.62 g·mol^{−1}
- 3D model (JSmol): Interactive image
- SMILES: CCC1=CC=C(C=C1)N(CC(C)C)S(=O)(=O)C2=CC(=C(C=C2)OCC3CCOCC3)CO
- InChI: InChI=1S/C25H35NO5S/c1-4-20-5-7-23(8-6-20)26(16-19(2)3)32(28,29)24-9-10-25(22(15-24)17-27)31-18-21-11-13-30-14-12-21/h5-10,15,19,21,27H,4,11-14,16-18H2,1-3H3; Key:LZLBRISQTJVZNP-UHFFFAOYSA-N

GSK2981278 is a drug which acts as a potent and selective inverse agonist of the receptor RAR-related orphan receptor gamma (RORγ). It has anti-inflammatory effects mediated by blocking production of various inflammatory mediators such as IL-1β, IL-6, IL-17 and TNFα, and was researched for the treatment of inflammatory conditions such as psoriasis, though it showed disappointing results in human clinical trials due to poor pharmacokinetic properties. However, it continues to be widely used for basic research into the function of RORγ and as a lead compound for the development of related drugs.
