= RAR-related orphan receptor beta =

Protein-coding gene in the species Homo sapiens

RORB
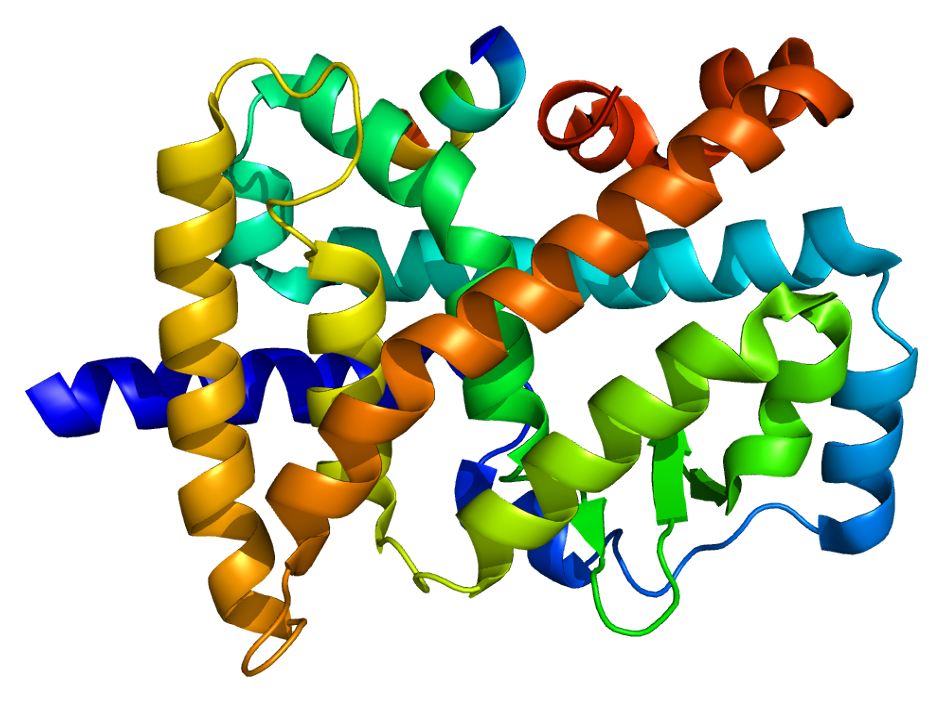

Identifiers
- Aliases: RORB, NR1F2, ROR-BETA, RZR-BETA, RZRB, bA133M9.1, RAR-related orphan receptor beta, RAR related orphan receptor B, EIG15
- External IDs: OMIM: 601972; MGI: 1343464; GeneCards: RORB

Gene location (Human)
Chr.	Chromosome 9 (human)
Band	9q21.13	Start	74,497,335 bp
Band	9q21.13	End	74,693,177 bp

Gene location (Mouse)
Chr.	Chromosome 19 (mouse)
Band	19|19 B	Start	18,907,969 bp
Band	19|19 B	End	19,088,560 bp
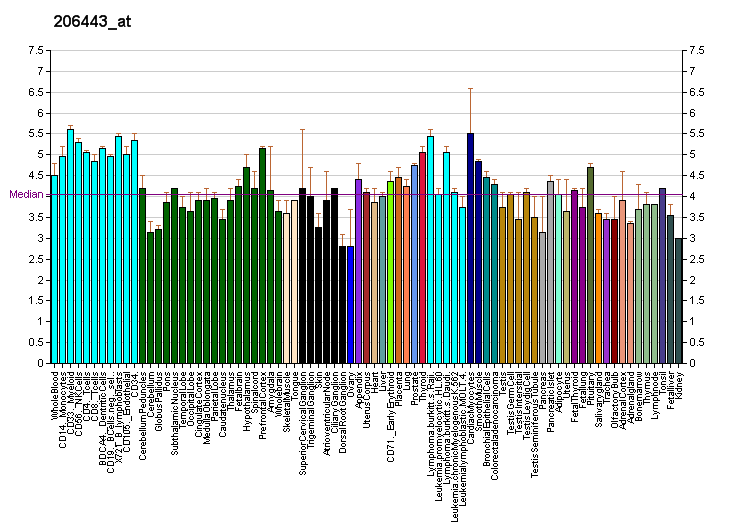
RNA expression pattern
Bgee	Human / Mouse (ortholog); Top expressed in: endothelial cell; Brodmann area 23; middle temporal gyrus; parietal lobe; postcentral gyrus; retinal pigment epithelium; primary visual cortex; superior frontal gyrus; entorhinal cortex; endometrium / Top expressed in: internal granular layer; medial geniculate nucleus; medial dorsal nucleus; lateral geniculate nucleus; Rostral migratory stream; retina; neural layer of retina; retinal pigment epithelium; lumbar subsegment of spinal cord; posterior horn of spinal cord; More reference expression data
BioGPS	More reference expression data
Gene ontology
Molecular function	sequence-specific DNA binding; DNA binding; DNA-binding transcription factor activity; zinc ion binding; transcription factor binding; metal ion binding; steroid hormone receptor activity; nuclear receptor activity; protein binding; RNA polymerase II cis-regulatory region sequence-specific DNA binding; DNA-binding transcription activator activity, RNA polymerase II-specific; DNA-binding transcription factor activity, RNA polymerase II-specific; melatonin receptor activity
Cellular component	nucleoplasm; nucleus
Biological process	cellular response to retinoic acid; regulation of transcription, DNA-templated; response to stimulus; rhythmic process; retinal cone cell development; negative regulation of osteoblast differentiation; transcription, DNA-templated; positive regulation of transcription, DNA-templated; multicellular organism development; regulation of circadian rhythm; retinal rod cell development; eye photoreceptor cell development; transcription initiation from RNA polymerase II promoter; negative regulation of transcription, DNA-templated; visual perception; steroid hormone mediated signaling pathway; intracellular receptor signaling pathway; amacrine cell differentiation; retina development in camera-type eye; positive regulation of transcription by RNA polymerase II; G protein-coupled receptor signaling pathway; transcription by RNA polymerase II
Sources:Amigo / QuickGO
Orthologs
Databases	NCBI: entry; OMA: entry
Species	Human	Mouse
Entrez	6096	225998
Ensembl	ENSG00000198963	ENSMUSG00000036192
UniProt	Q92753; Q58EY0	Q8R1B8
RefSeq (mRNA)	NM_006914; NM_001365023	NM_001043354; NM_001289921; NM_146095
RefSeq (protein)	NP_008845; NP_001351952	NP_001036819; NP_001276850; NP_666207
Location (UCSC)	Chr 9: 74.5 – 74.69 Mb	Chr 19: 18.91 – 19.09 Mb
PubMed search
- Wikidata
View/Edit Human	View/Edit Mouse

RAR-related orphan receptor beta (ROR-beta), also known as NR1F2 (nuclear receptor subfamily 1, group F, member 2) is a nuclear receptor that in humans is encoded by the RORB gene.

== Function ==
The protein encoded by this gene is a member of the NR1 subfamily of nuclear hormone receptors. It is a DNA-binding protein that can bind as a monomer or as a homodimer to hormone response elements upstream of several genes to enhance the expression of those genes. The specific functions of this protein are not known, but it has been shown to interact with NM23-2, a nucleoside-diphosphate kinase involved in organogenesis and differentiation.

In the brain, ROR-beta is concentrated in layer 4 of the cerebral cortex, where it plays a role in the development of structures such as barrel columns.

A mutation in this gene also results in the loss of spinal cord interneurons and of saltatorial locomotion, a type of hopping gait that in mammals can be found in rabbits, hares, kangaroos, and some species of rodents.

== Interactions ==
RAR-related orphan receptor beta has been shown to interact with NME1.

== See also ==
- RAR-related orphan receptor
