= Bevurogant =

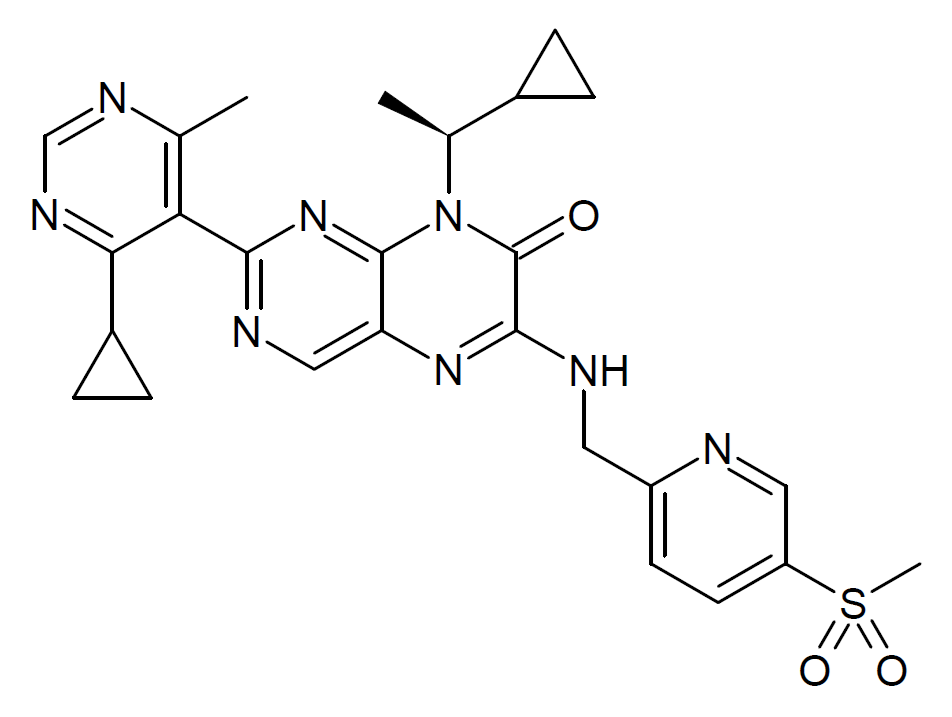

Clinical data
- Other names: BI 730357
- Drug class: RORγ agonist

Identifiers
- IUPAC name: 8-[(1S)-1-cyclopropylethyl]-2-(4-cyclopropyl-6-methylpyrimidin-5-yl)-6-[(5-methylsulfonyl-2-pyridinyl)methylamino]pteridin-7-one
- CAS Number: 1817773-66-2
- PubChem CID: 118440466
- DrugBank: DB21507
- ChemSpider: 114711335
- UNII: 1874HVK11I
- ChEMBL: ChEMBL4760304

Chemical and physical data
- Formula: C_{26}H_{28}N_{8}O_{3}S
- Molar mass: 532.62 g·mol^{−1}
- 3D model (JSmol): Interactive image
- SMILES: CC1=C(C(=NC=N1)C2CC2)C3=NC=C4C(=N3)N(C(=O)C(=N4)NCC5=NC=C(C=C5)S(=O)(=O)C)[C@@H](C)C6CC6
- InChI: InChI=1S/C26H28N8O3S/c1-14-21(22(17-6-7-17)31-13-30-14)23-29-12-20-25(33-23)34(15(2)16-4-5-16)26(35)24(32-20)28-10-18-8-9-19(11-27-18)38(3,36)37/h8-9,11-13,15-17H,4-7,10H2,1-3H3,(H,28,32)/t15-/m0/s1; Key:HVVHIBHBDCYLDI-HNNXBMFYSA-N

Bevurogant (BI 730357) is a drug which acts as a potent and selective antagonist (or perhaps inverse agonist) of the receptor RAR-related orphan receptor gamma (RORγ). It has anti-inflammatory effects and has been researched for the treatment of various conditions in which inflammation plays a role.
