= Response element =

Type of short DNA sequence

Response elements are short sequences of DNA within a gene promoter or enhancer region that are able to bind specific transcription factors and regulate transcription of genes.

Under conditions of stress, a transcription activator protein binds to the response element and stimulates transcription. If the same response element sequence is located in the control regions of different genes, then these genes will be activated by the same stimuli, thus producing a coordinated response.

== Hormone response element ==
A hormone response element (HRE) is a short sequence of DNA within the promoter of a gene, that is able to bind to a specific hormone receptor complex and therefore regulate transcription. In the case of steroid hormone receptors, the sequence is most commonly a pair of inverted repeats separated by three nucleotides, which also indicates that the receptor binds as a dimer. First a steroid hormone binds to the receptor, next the activated steroid receptor binds to the HRE, and this modifies gene transcription.

A gene may have many different response elements, allowing complex control to be exerted over the level and rate of transcription.

HRE are used in transgenic animal cells as inducers of gene expression.

Examples of HREs include estrogen response elements and androgen response elements.

== Examples ==
Examples of response elements include:

- Nuclear receptor (NR) response elements – two 6-meric repeats for dimeric binding
  - Type 1 NR response elements: inverted repeat
    - estrogen response elements (EREs) - GGTCAnnnTGACC
    - androgen response elements (AREs) - IR3 AGAACAnnnTGTTCT and a direct-repeat version specific to AR
    - glucocorticoid response elements (GREs) - AGAACAnnnTGTTCT - same canonical half-site for PR and MR
  - Type 2 NR response elements: direct repeat RGKTCA motifs, canonically AGGTCA
    - Vitamin D response element (VDRE)
    - Retinoic acid response elements (RAREs)
    - ROR-response element
    - Thyroid hormone response element
    - Growth hormone response element (GHRE)
    - Peroxisome proliferator hormone response elements (PPREs)
- cAMP response element (CRE) - CREB
- B recognition element (BRE)
- xenobiotic response element (XRE) - Aryl hydrocarbon receptor
- Hypoxia-responsive elements (HREs) - HIF
- Serum response element (SRE) - SRF
- Metal-responsive element (MRE) - MTF1
- DNA damage response element (DRE), TTTCAAT upstream of RAD51
- IFN-stimulated response elements (ISREs)
- Calcium-response element CaRE1 InterPro: IPR029309
- Antioxidant response element (ARE) - NFE2L2
- p53 response element, RRRCWWGYYY
- Sterol regulatory element (StRE)
- Polycomb response elements (PREs)
- HIV Rev response element (RRE)
- Wnt response element (WRE), core CTTTG
