= TMEM8B =

Protein-coding gene in humans

Identifiers
- Aliases: TMEM8B, C9orf127, NAG-5, NGX6, NAG5, transmembrane protein 8B
- External IDs: OMIM: 616888; MGI: 2441680; GeneCards: TMEM8B

Gene location (Human)
Chr.	Chromosome 9 (human)
Band	9p13.3	Start	35,814,451 bp
Band	9p13.3	End	35,865,518 bp

Gene location (Mouse)
Chr.	Chromosome 4 (mouse)
Band	4|4 A5	Start	43,668,971 bp
Band	4|4 A5	End	43,692,668 bp
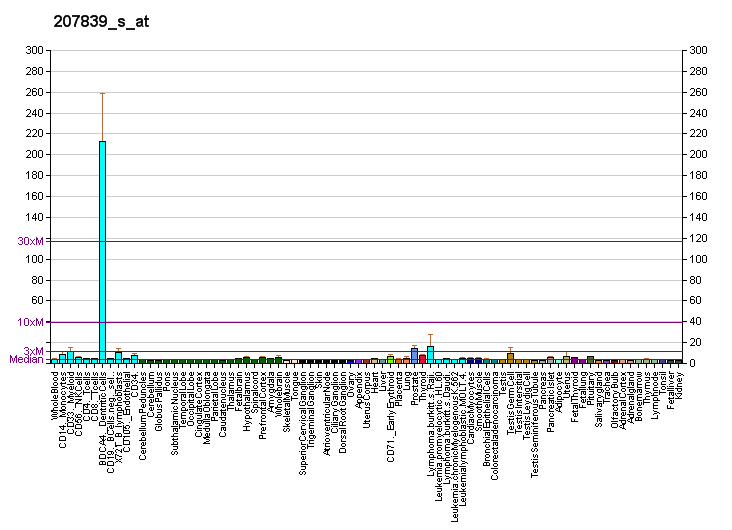
RNA expression pattern
Bgee	Human / Mouse (ortholog); Top expressed in: left ovary; right ovary; anterior pituitary; tendon of biceps brachii; right uterine tube; popliteal artery; tibial arteries; right frontal lobe; right adrenal cortex; body of uterus / Top expressed in: spermatid; hippocampus proper; dentate gyrus of hippocampal formation granule cell; primary visual cortex; hypothalamus; superior frontal gyrus; ganglionic eminence; striatum of neuraxis; testicle; spermatocyte; More reference expression data
BioGPS	More reference expression data
Gene ontology
Molecular function	protein binding
Cellular component	cytoplasm; integral component of membrane; cell surface; plasma membrane; endoplasmic reticulum; mitochondrion; nucleus; membrane
Biological process	regulation of growth; cell-matrix adhesion; cell adhesion; regulation of mitotic cell cycle
Sources:Amigo / QuickGO
Orthologs
Databases	NCBI: entry; OMA: entry
Species	Human	Mouse
Entrez	51754	242409
Ensembl	ENSG00000137103	ENSMUSG00000078716
UniProt	A6NDV4	B1AWJ5
RefSeq (mRNA)	NM_001042589; NM_001042590; NM_016446; NM_001363620; NM_001363621 NM_001363622; NM_001363625	NM_001085508; NM_001355718; NM_001368840; NM_001368841; NM_001368842
RefSeq (protein)	NP_001036054; NP_001036055; NP_057530; NP_001350549; NP_001350550 NP_001350551; NP_001350554	NP_001078977; NP_001342647; NP_001355769; NP_001355770; NP_001355771
Location (UCSC)	Chr 9: 35.81 – 35.87 Mb	Chr 4: 43.67 – 43.69 Mb
PubMed search
- Wikidata
View/Edit Human	View/Edit Mouse

Transmembrane protein 8B is a protein that in humans is encoded by the TMEM8B gene. It encodes for a transmembrane protein that is 338 amino acids long, and is located on human chromosome 9. Aliases associated with this gene include C9orf127, NAG-5, and NGX61.

== Gene ==
=== Location ===
Cytogenic location: 9p13.3 Located on chromosome 9 in the human genome. It starts at base pair 35,814,451, and ends at 35,865,518, and contains 19 exons. There are 13 transcript variants that are protein encoding, and the longest transcript variant is 790 amino acids long.

=== Expression ===
Using information from NCBI's EST Abundance Profile page on TMEM8B, expression levels vary in 32 different human tissues. The highest levels of expression can be found in the brain, ovaries, prostate, placenta, and the pancreas. Expression levels are down regulated in some cancerous tissue, specifically nasopharyngeal and colorectal carcinomas. TMEM8B is expressed in all stages of development, including fetal stages, as low levels of expression are present in the fetal liver, brain, and thymus.

== mRNA ==
=== Splice variants ===
TMEM8B has 13 known mRNA splice variants in humans: Refer to the table below. All 13 variants are protein encoding, and all contain 19 exons.

Name	Accession number	Amino Acid Length	mRNA
Isoform A	NP_001036055.1	472	NM_001042589.2
Isoform B	NP_057530.2	338	NM_016446.3
Isoform X1	XP_011516213.1	508	XM_011517911.2
Isoform X2	XP_011516204.1	498	XM_011517902.2
Isoform X3	XP_024303339.1	482	XM_024447571.1
Isoform X4	XP_011516205.1	399	XM_011517903.2
Isoform X5	XP_024303338.1	373	XM_024447570.1
Isoform X6	XP_011516206.1	790	XM_011517904.3
Isoform X7	XP_011516207.1	334	XM_011517905.1
Isoform X8	XP_016870294.1	675	XM_017014805.1
Isoform X9	XP_011516218.1	450	XM_011517916.2
Isoform X10	XP_016870296.1	406	XM_017014807.1
Isoform X11	XP_011516220.1	398	XM_011517918.3

The figure below from NCBI Gene depicts the chromosomal location of each isoform in comparison to TMEM8B.

Figure 1: Location of each isoform relative to the original TMEM8B.

== Protein ==
=== Protein analysis ===
Protein analysis was completed on Isoform A. TMEM8B isoform A is 472 amino acids long. The molecular weight is 36.8 kDa, and the isoelectric point is 6.773. There are 7 transmembrane domains, resulting in 52% of the protein to be within the plasma membrane. The C-charge> N-charge, and therefore the C-terminal end is on the inside. Transmembrane domains are conserved in most orthologs, including all mammals. Relative to other proteins, TMEM8B has higher than normal levels of K, Lysine, and L, Leucine. There are three repeating leucine-rich regions within conserved domains of TMEM8B, all 4 amino acids long. Leucine rich regions can result in hydrophobic interactions within themselves.

=== Secondary structure ===
Identifying the secondary structure is helpful in further analyzing the function of this protein. Alpha helices are the strongest indicators of transmembrane regions, as the helical structure can satisfy all backbone hydrogen-bonds internally. This is why the secondary structure of this protein is practical, as many of the alpha helices lie in the predicted transmembrane regions. Other key structures identified in this protein include extended strands, which are hypothesized to be important folding regions, and random coils, a class of conformations in the absence of a regular secondary structure.

Figure 2: Predicted secondary structure of TMEM8B, Isoform A. Predicted transmembrane domains are highlighted in green

=== Tertiary structure ===
I-TASSER predicted the 3D tertiary structure of TMEM8B, with strategic folding of the alpha helices and beta sheets. Although there are no high scoring hydrophobic segments of TMEM8B, that would usually be hidden within the interior of the 3D structure, the high amounts of Leuceine (L) amino acids in this protein creates hydrophobic interactions with itself, and these areas are predicted to be buried on the inside of the structure. Refer to the figure below to see a predicted tertiary structure.

Figure 3: Predicted tertiary structure of TMEM8B.

TMEM8B highly resembles a tertiary structure that is similar to the Reelin protein, predicted by a 42% coverage and 14.79% identity. The Reelin protein has no transmembrane domains, and is mostly found in the cerebral cortex and the hippocampus, where it plays important roles in the control of neuronal migration and formation of cellular layers during brain development.

Figure 4: Multiple sequence alignment of the Reelin protein and TMEM8B, color coordinating with the tertiary structure.

== Homologogy ==
=== Orthologs ===
The orthologs of TMEM8B were sequenced in BLAST and 20 various orthologs were picked. The orthologs are all multicellular organisms, and vary through mammals, rodents, birds, fish, amphibians, echinoderms, chordates, insects, and cnidarians. Refer to the table below. Time tree was a program that was used to find the evolutionary branching shown in MYA, and conserved domains of the genome were found and analyzed using ClustalW.

Genus Species	Common name	Divergence from Humans (MYA)	Accession number	Amino Acid Length	Sequence identity ! !Sequence similarity	
Homo sapiens	Humans	--	EAW58325.1	338	--	--
Carlito syrichta	Philippine tarsier	67.1	XP_008061336.2	273	96%	97%
Trichechus manatus latirostris	Florida manatee	105	XP_004372337.1	273	96%	97%
Neomonachus schauinslandi	Hawaiian monk seal	96	XP_021546789.1	280	96%	96%
Pelecanus Crispus	Dalmatian pelican	312	XP_009481450.1	219	75%	86%
Salmo salar	Atlantic salmon	435	XP_013999021.1	494	68%	86%
Struthio camelus australis	Southern ostrich	312	XP_009675834.1	283	70%	81%
Cariama cristata	Red-legged seriema	312	XP_009701221.1	280	68%	80%
Egretta garzetta	Little egret	312	XP_009645653.1	282	68%	79%
Sinocyclocheilus graham	Golden line fish	435	XP_016091386.1	295	62%	76%
Charadrius vociferus	Kildeer	312	XP_009889203.1	420	63%	75%
Chrysochloris asiatica	Cape golden mole	105	XP_006863153.1	392	93%	75%
Branchiostoma belcheri	Belcher's Lancelet	684	XP_019646192.1	209	37%	54%
Xenopus laevis	African clawed frog	352	XP_018123357.1	480	65%	50%
Diachasma alloeum	Common house spider	797	XP_015126938.1	252	29%	47%
Megachile rotundata	Alfalfa leafcutting bee	797	XP_003700975.2	242	29%	46%
Strongylocentrotus purpuratus	Purple sea urchin	684	XP_011666469.1	240	23%	38%
Cryptotermes brevis	Termite	794	XP_023705434.1	361	31%	29%
Exaiptasia pallida	Sea anemone	824	XP_020898578.1	361	29%	28%
Ciona intestinalis	Vase tunicate	676	XP_009857467.1	384	33%	18%

=== Paralogs ===
One human paralog was found when this protein was sequenced in BLAST. It is 416 amino acids long, with 40% sequence identity, and 45% sequence similarity. Accision number for this protein is: NP_067082.2.

=== Divergence of TMEM8B ===
In an evolutionary comparison of TMEM8B, one species from each group (ex. Mammals, birds, fish) was plotted to avoid overabundance of information on one graph. Also plotted the comparison of the quickly diverging cytochrome C, and slowly diverging fibrinogen. TMEM8B shows divergence somewhere in-between these two proteins.

Figure 5: Evolutionary timeline for ten species including humans.

== Clinical significance ==
TMEM8B shows lower expression rates in nasopharyngeal carcinomas, and expression is also down regulated in colorectal cancers. This gene also plays a negative role in an Epidermal Growth Factor Receptor (EGFR) pathway. It can delay cell cycle G0-G1 progression, and thus inhibit cell proliferation in nasopharyngeal carcinoma cells.

Mutations with this gene can be pathogenic, and cause chronic pain disorders, specifically erythromelalgia symptoms. Erythromelalgia is a rare condition that affects the extremities (hands and feet), and is characterized by intense, burning pain, severe redness, and increased skin temperature. Medications are available to reduce symptoms, however, there is no cure for this rare condition.

== Interacting proteins ==
Two interacting proteins were found: EGF protein, and ATXN1L protein.

EGF plays a role in cell adhesion in nasopharyngeal carcinomas (TMEM8B also plays a role in these carcinomas). This protein is expressed on the cell surface as a glycoprotein, and ectopic induction of EGF can impair NPC cell migration and improve cell adhesion and gap junctional intercellular communication.

ATXN1L protein has a correlation with neurodegenerative disorders. Neurodegenerative disorders are characterized by a loss of balance due to the cerebellar Purkinje degeneration. Ataxia-causing proteins share interacting partners, a subset of which has been found to modify neurodegeneration in animal models. Interactome provides a tool for understanding pathogenic mechanisms common for neurodegenerative disorders.
