= Retinoid receptor =

Nuclear receptors that bind to retinoids

Retinoid receptors are type II nuclear receptors (a class of proteins) that bind to retinoids. When bound to a retinoid, they act as transcription factors, altering the expression of genes with corresponding response elements.

Subtypes include:

- Retinoic acid receptors (RARs)
- Retinoid X receptors (RXRs)
- RAR-related orphan receptors (RORs)
