= NME1 =

Protein-coding gene in the species Homo sapiens

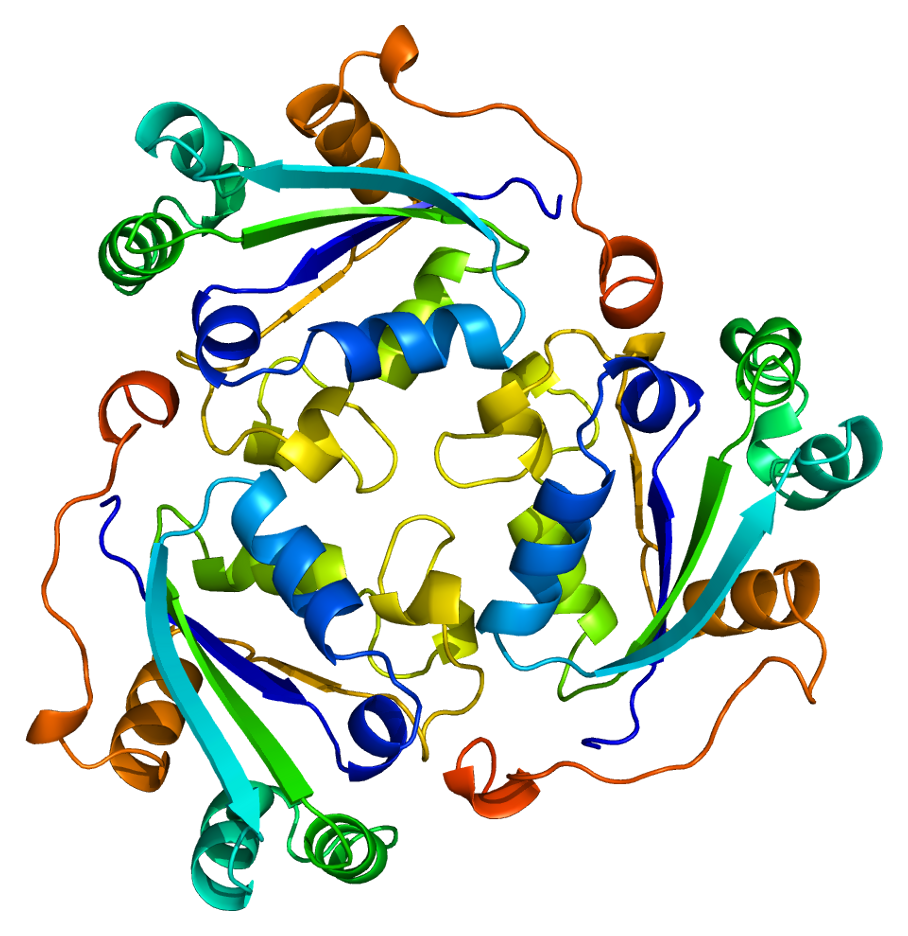

Identifiers
- Aliases: NME1, AWD, GAAD, NB, NBS, NDKA, NDPK-A, NDPKA, NM23, NM23-H1, NME/NM23 nucleoside diphosphate kinase 1
- External IDs: OMIM: 156490; MGI: 97355; GeneCards: NME1
Available structures
PDB	Ortholog search: PDBe RCSB
PDB	List of PDB id codes 1JXV, 1UCN, 2HVD, 2HVE, 3L7U, 4ENO
Enzyme activity
EC #	BRENDA	ExPASy	KEGG	MetaCyc
2.7.4.6	↗	↗	↗	↗
2.7.4.18	↗	↗	↗	↗
2.7.11.1	↗	↗	↗	↗
2.7.13.3	↗	↗	↗	↗

Gene location (Human)
Chr.	Chromosome 17 (human)
Band	17q21.33	Start	51,153,559 bp
Band	17q21.33	End	51,162,428 bp

Gene location (Mouse)
Chr.	Chromosome 11 (mouse)
Band	11|11 D	Start	93,847,805 bp
Band	11|11 D	End	93,859,347 bp
RNA expression pattern
Bgee	Human / Mouse (ortholog); Top expressed in: prefrontal cortex; hypothalamus; Brodmann area 9; superior frontal gyrus; islet of Langerhans; ganglionic eminence; right frontal lobe; hippocampus proper; primary visual cortex; cingulate gyrus / Top expressed in: right kidney; epiblast; neural tube; proximal tubule; embryo; embryo; ganglionic eminence; dentate gyrus of hippocampal formation granule cell; morula; blastocyst; More reference expression data
BioGPS	n/a
Gene ontology
Molecular function	transferase activity; nucleotide binding; deoxyribonuclease activity; ribosomal small subunit binding; GTP binding; metal ion binding; kinase activity; protein binding; identical protein binding; ATP binding; magnesium ion binding; nucleoside diphosphate kinase activity; RNA binding; RNA polymerase II transcription regulatory region sequence-specific DNA binding; single-stranded DNA binding; intermediate filament binding; enzyme binding; protein kinase binding; gamma-tubulin binding
Cellular component	ruffle membrane; extracellular exosome; nucleus; cytoplasm; mitochondrial outer membrane; centrosome; cytosol; intermediate filament; membrane; perinuclear region of cytoplasm; mitochondrion; myelin sheath
Biological process	UTP biosynthetic process; regulation of apoptotic process; cell differentiation; nucleobase-containing small molecule interconversion; CTP biosynthetic process; endocytosis; phosphorylation; positive regulation of epithelial cell proliferation; nucleotide metabolic process; nucleoside diphosphate phosphorylation; nervous system development; positive regulation of DNA binding; GTP biosynthetic process; negative regulation of cell population proliferation; DNA metabolic process; negative regulation of myeloid leukocyte differentiation; negative regulation of gene expression; positive regulation of neuron projection development; response to amine; hippocampus development; response to testosterone; response to cAMP; cellular response to glucose stimulus; cellular response to fatty acid; lactation; mammary gland development
Sources:Amigo / QuickGO
Orthologs
Databases	NCBI: entry; OMA: entry
Species	Human	Mouse
Entrez	4830	18102
Ensembl	ENSG00000239672	ENSMUSG00000037601
UniProt	P15531	P15532
RefSeq (mRNA)	NM_198175; NM_000269	NM_008704; NM_001378854
RefSeq (protein)	NP_000260; NP_937818	NP_032730; NP_001365783
Location (UCSC)	Chr 17: 51.15 – 51.16 Mb	Chr 11: 93.85 – 93.86 Mb
PubMed search
- Wikidata
View/Edit Human	View/Edit Mouse

Nucleoside diphosphate kinase A is an enzyme that in humans is encoded by the NME1 gene. It is thought to be a metastasis suppressor.

== Function ==
This gene (NME1) was identified because of its reduced mRNA transcript levels in highly metastatic cells. Nucleoside diphosphate kinase (NDK) exists as a hexamer composed of 'A' (encoded by this gene) and 'B' (encoded by NME2) isoforms. Mutations in this gene have been identified in aggressive neuroblastomas. Two transcript variants encoding different isoforms have been found for this gene. Co-transcription of this gene and the neighboring downstream gene (NME2) generates naturally occurring transcripts (NME1-NME2), which encodes a fusion protein consisting of sequence sharing identity with each individual gene product.

A bioinformatics study published in 2023 suggested that the NME1 gene might have a prognostic role in neuroblastoma.

== Interactions ==
NME1 has been shown to interact with:

- Aurora A kinase,
- CD29
- NME3,
- Protein SET,
- RAR-related orphan receptor alpha,
- RAR-related orphan receptor beta, and
- TERF1.

== See also ==
- Nucleoside-diphosphate kinase
