= MTF1 =

Protein-coding gene in humans

Identifiers
- Aliases: MTF1, MTF-1, ZRF, metal-regulatory transcription factor 1, metal regulatory transcription factor 1
- External IDs: OMIM: 600172; MGI: 101786; GeneCards: MTF1

Gene location (Human)
Chr.	Chromosome 1 (human)
Band	1p34.3	Start	37,809,574 bp
Band	1p34.3	End	37,859,592 bp

Gene location (Mouse)
Chr.	Chromosome 4 (mouse)
Band	4 D2.2|4 57.91 cM	Start	124,695,897 bp
Band	4 D2.2|4 57.91 cM	End	124,743,593 bp
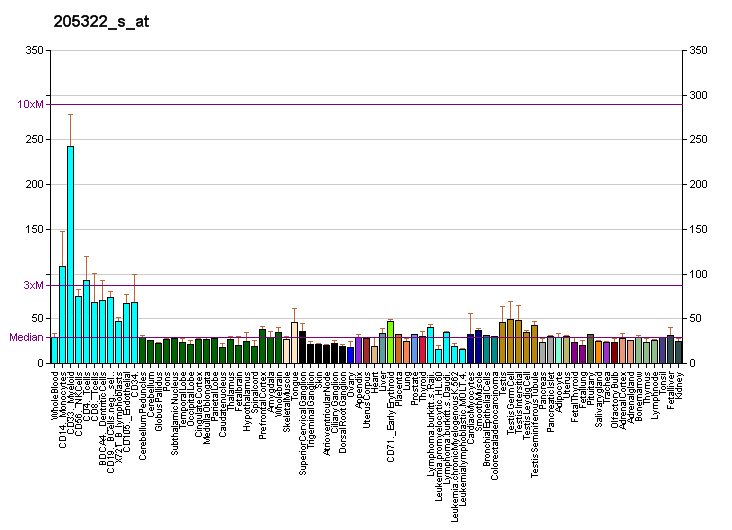

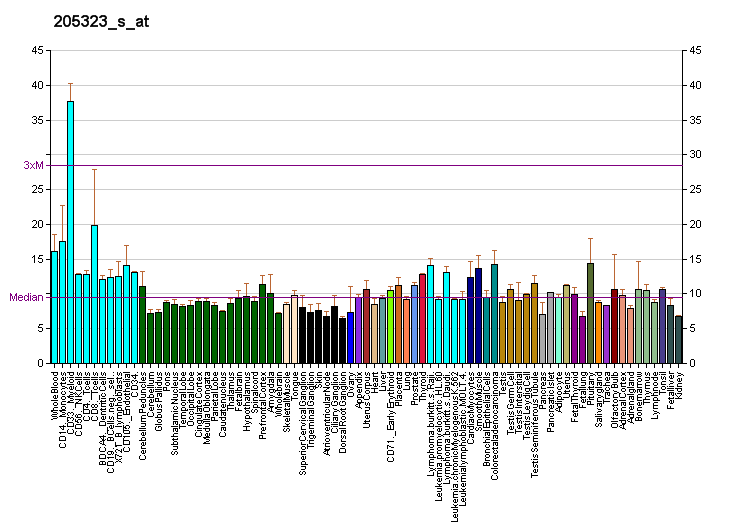
RNA expression pattern
Bgee	Human / Mouse (ortholog); Top expressed in: secondary oocyte; buccal mucosa cell; mucosa of paranasal sinus; oral cavity; epithelium of bronchus; bronchial epithelial cell; nipple; internal globus pallidus; tendon of biceps brachii; gums / Top expressed in: spermatid; zygote; spermatocyte; seminiferous tubule; secondary oocyte; primary oocyte; internal carotid artery; motor neuron; lacrimal gland; retinal pigment epithelium; More reference expression data
BioGPS	More reference expression data
Gene ontology
Molecular function	DNA binding; DNA-binding transcription factor activity; transcription coactivator activity; DNA-binding transcription activator activity, RNA polymerase II-specific; metal ion binding; protein binding; histone acetyltransferase binding; nucleic acid binding; RNA polymerase II cis-regulatory region sequence-specific DNA binding; DNA-binding transcription factor activity, RNA polymerase II-specific; cis-regulatory region sequence-specific DNA binding; RNA polymerase II transcription regulatory region sequence-specific DNA binding
Cellular component	nucleus; nucleoplasm
Biological process	response to cadmium ion; regulation of transcription, DNA-templated; regulation of transcription by RNA polymerase II; response to metal ion; response to oxidative stress; transcription, DNA-templated; positive regulation of transcription, DNA-templated; positive regulation of transcription by RNA polymerase II; transcription by RNA polymerase II; central nervous system development
Sources:Amigo / QuickGO
Orthologs
Databases	NCBI: entry; OMA: entry
Species	Human	Mouse
Entrez	4520	17764
Ensembl	ENSG00000188786	ENSMUSG00000028890
UniProt	Q14872	Q07243
RefSeq (mRNA)	NM_005955	NM_008636
RefSeq (protein)	NP_005946	NP_032662
Location (UCSC)	Chr 1: 37.81 – 37.86 Mb	Chr 4: 124.7 – 124.74 Mb
PubMed search
- Wikidata
View/Edit Human	View/Edit Mouse

Metal regulatory transcription factor 1 is a protein that in humans is encoded by the MTF1 gene.

== Function ==
This gene encodes a transcription factor that induces expression of metallothioneins and other genes involved in metal homeostasis in response to heavy metals such as cadmium, zinc, copper, and silver. The protein is a nucleocytoplasmic shuttling protein that accumulates in the nucleus upon heavy metal exposure and binds to promoters containing a metal-responsive element (MRE).
