= NME3 =

Protein-coding gene in the species Homo sapiens

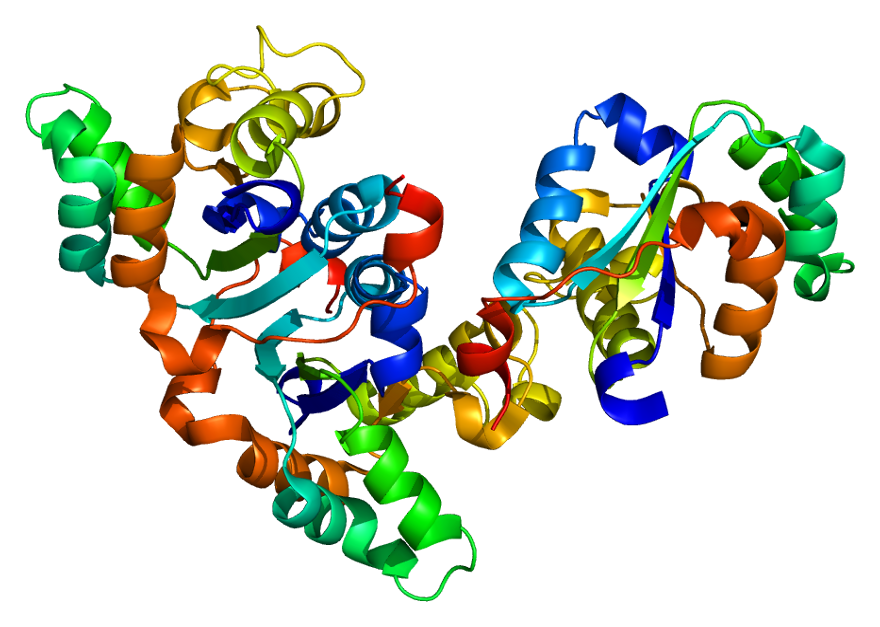

Identifiers
- Aliases: NME3, DR-nm23, NDPK-C, NDPKC, NM23-H3, NM23H3, c371H6.2, NME/NM23 nucleoside diphosphate kinase 3
- External IDs: OMIM: 601817; MGI: 1930182; GeneCards: NME3
Available structures
PDB	Ortholog search: PDBe RCSB
PDB	List of PDB id codes 1ZS6
Enzyme activity
EC #	BRENDA	ExPASy	KEGG	MetaCyc
2.7.4.6	↗	↗	↗	↗

Gene location (Human)
Chr.	Chromosome 16 (human)
Band	16p13.3	Start	1,770,320 bp
Band	16p13.3	End	1,771,561 bp

Gene location (Mouse)
Chr.	Chromosome 17 (mouse)
Band	17|17 A3.3	Start	25,115,474 bp
Band	17|17 A3.3	End	25,116,496 bp
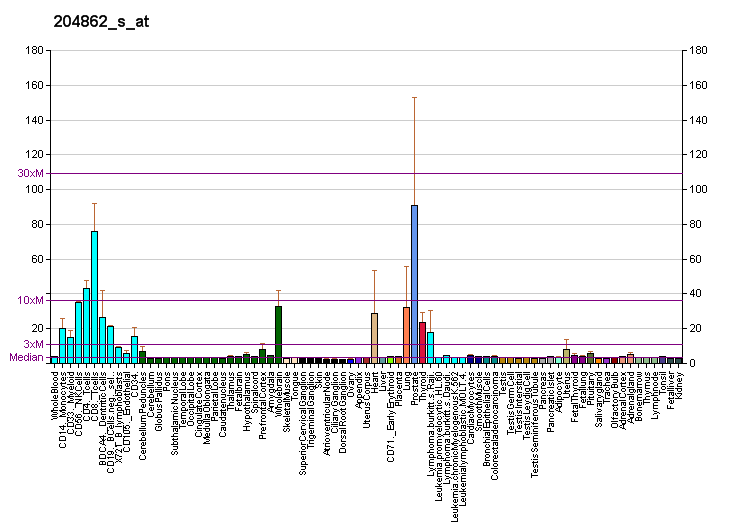
RNA expression pattern
Bgee	Human / Mouse (ortholog); Top expressed in: anterior pituitary; right hemisphere of cerebellum; right adrenal gland; left adrenal cortex; right adrenal cortex; right uterine tube; canal of the cervix; gastric mucosa; left uterine tube; muscle layer of sigmoid colon / Top expressed in: bone marrow; pancreas; adrenal gland; islet of Langerhans; urinary bladder; embryo; proximal tubule; right kidney; epiblast; hypothalamus; More reference expression data
BioGPS	More reference expression data
Gene ontology
Molecular function	kinase activity; nucleotide binding; transferase activity; protein binding; ATP binding; metal ion binding; nucleoside diphosphate kinase activity
Cellular component	cytosol; intracellular anatomical structure
Biological process	UTP biosynthetic process; apoptotic process; CTP biosynthetic process; GTP biosynthetic process; nucleotide metabolic process; nucleoside diphosphate phosphorylation; phosphorylation; nucleobase-containing small molecule interconversion; regulation of apoptotic process
Sources:Amigo / QuickGO
Orthologs
Databases	NCBI: entry; OMA: entry
Species	Human	Mouse
Entrez	4832	79059
Ensembl	ENSG00000103024	ENSMUSG00000073435
UniProt	Q13232	Q9WV85
RefSeq (mRNA)	NM_002513	NM_019730
RefSeq (protein)	NP_002504	NP_062704
Location (UCSC)	Chr 16: 1.77 – 1.77 Mb	Chr 17: 25.12 – 25.12 Mb
PubMed search
- Wikidata
View/Edit Human	View/Edit Mouse

Nucleoside diphosphate kinase 3 is an enzyme that in humans is encoded by the NME3 gene.

== Interactions ==
NME3 has been shown to interact with NME1 and NME2.

== Clinical significance ==
Mutations in this gene have been associated with congenital hypotonia, hypoventilation and cerebellar histopathological alterations.
