= CGP 52608 =

Names
- IUPAC name 3-Methyl-1-[(4-oxo-3-prop-2-enyl-1,3-thiazolidin-2-ylidene)amino]thiourea

Identifiers
CAS Number	87958-67-6
3D model (JSmol)	Interactive image
ChemSpider	4589397
PubChem CID	6509863
UNII	QS3ABF85TR
- InChI: InChI=1/C8H12N4OS2/c1-3-4-12-6(13)5-15-8(12)11-10-7(14)9-2/h3H,1,4-5H2,2H3,(H2,9,10,14)/b11-8- Key: DDYJDIHOSRTMSE-FLIBITNWBI
- SMILES: S=C(N\N=C1/SCC(=O)N1C\C=C)NC

Properties
Chemical formula	C_{8}H_{12}N_{4}OS_{2}
Molar mass	244.33 g·mol^{−1}
- Except where otherwise noted, data are given for materials in their standard state (at 25 °C [77 °F], 100 kPa). Infobox references

CGP 52608 is a selective ligand of the RAR-related orphan receptor alpha. It has been used as a biochemical tool to investigate nuclear and membrane signaling of melatonin. CGP 52608 has also been reported to possess antiarthritic activity. The pharmaceutical company Novartis brought it to clinical trials for rheumatoid arthritis, but development was discontinued in 2006.

CGP 52608 contains a thiazolinidinedione group.
