= RAR-related orphan receptor gamma =

Cellular receptor

RORC
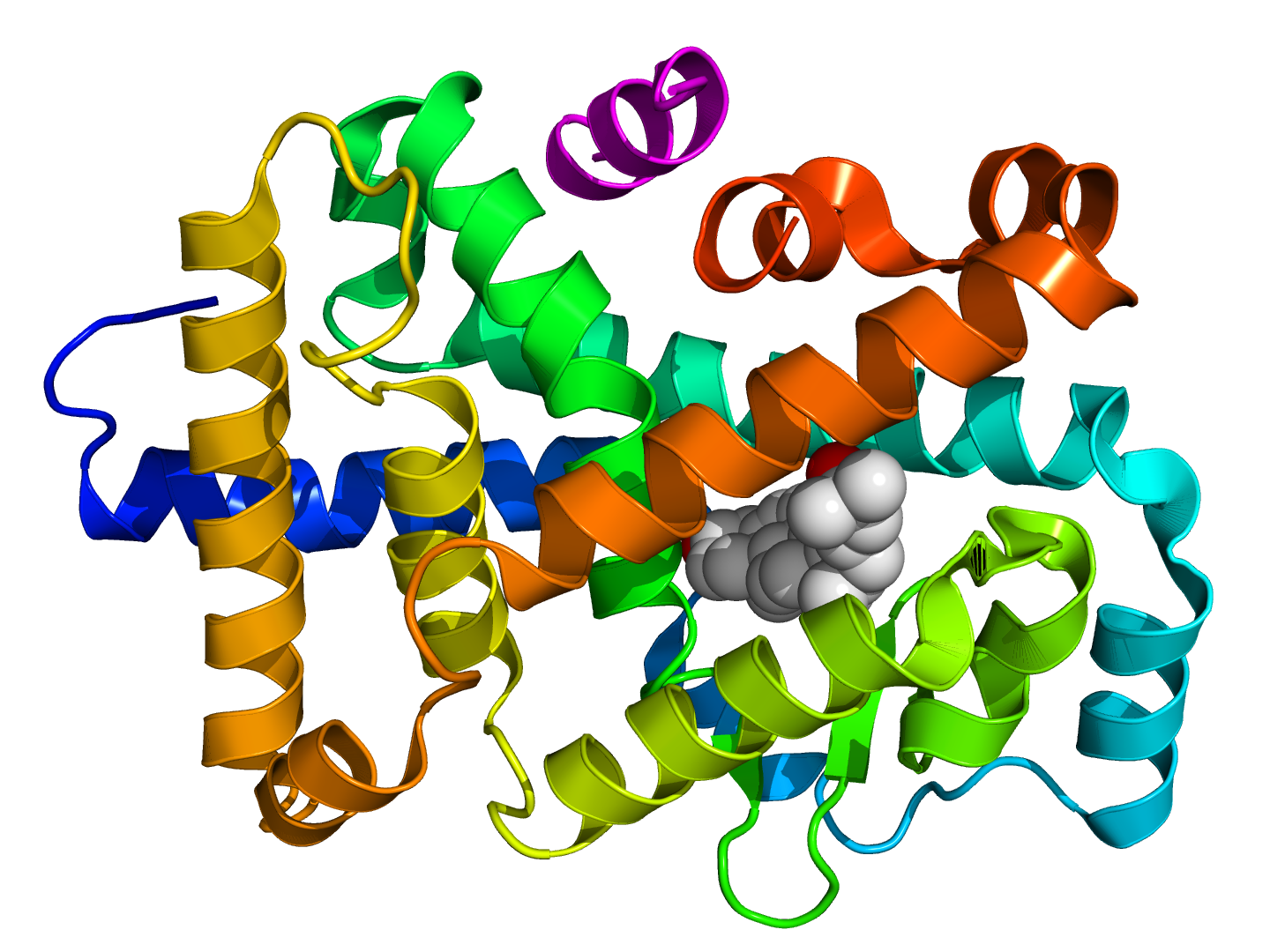

Identifiers
- Aliases: RORC, NR1F3, RORG, RZR-GAMMA, RZRG, TOR, RAR-related orphan receptor gamma, IMD42, RAR related orphan receptor C
- External IDs: OMIM: 602943; MGI: 104856; GeneCards: RORC
Available structures
| PDB | Ortholog search: PDBe RCSB |
| PDB | List of PDB id codes 3B0W, 3KYT, 3L0J, 3L0L, 4NB6, 4NIE, 4QM0, 4S14, 4WLB, 4WPF, 4WQP, 4XT9, 4YMQ, 4ZJR, 4ZJW, 4ZOM, 5C4O, 5APK, 5APJ, 5APH, 5C4U, 5C4S, 5C4T, 4YPQ, 5AYG, 5IXK, 5IZ0, 5EJV, 5ETH |

Gene location (Human)
| Chr. | Chromosome 1 (human) |
| Band | 1q21.3 | Start | 151,806,071 bp |
| Band | 1q21.3 | End | 151,831,845 bp |

Gene location (Mouse)
| Chr. | Chromosome 3 (mouse) |
| Band | 3|3 F2.1 | Start | 94,280,101 bp |
| Band | 3|3 F2.1 | End | 94,305,583 bp |
RNA expression pattern
| Bgee | Human / Mouse (ortholog); Top expressed in: gastrocnemius muscle; testicle; muscle of thigh; right lobe of liver; right uterine tube; Skeletal muscle tissue of rectus abdominis; parotid gland; body of pancreas; olfactory zone of nasal mucosa; vastus lateralis muscle / Top expressed in: muscle of thigh; thymus; cortex of thymus; thin ascending limb of loop of Henle; pelvic ganglion; digastric muscle; skeletal muscle tissue; temporal muscle; extraocular muscle; right kidney; More reference expression data |
| BioGPS | n/a |
Gene ontology
| Molecular function | DNA binding; sequence-specific DNA binding; ligand-activated transcription factor activity; DNA-binding transcription factor activity; zinc ion binding; metal ion binding; steroid hormone receptor activity; nuclear receptor activity; protein binding; oxysterol binding; RNA polymerase II cis-regulatory region sequence-specific DNA binding; DNA-binding transcription repressor activity, RNA polymerase II-specific; DNA-binding transcription factor activity, RNA polymerase II-specific; transcription coactivator binding |
| Cellular component | nucleoplasm; nucleus; nuclear body |
| Biological process | regulation of transcription, DNA-templated; rhythmic process; cellular response to sterol; negative regulation of thymocyte apoptotic process; circadian regulation of gene expression; regulation of fat cell differentiation; transcription, DNA-templated; regulation of steroid metabolic process; positive regulation of transcription, DNA-templated; multicellular organism development; regulation of glucose metabolic process; circadian rhythm; xenobiotic metabolic process; positive regulation of circadian rhythm; adipose tissue development; T-helper 17 cell differentiation; Peyer's patch development; transcription initiation from RNA polymerase II promoter; T-helper cell differentiation; lymph node development; steroid hormone mediated signaling pathway; intracellular receptor signaling pathway; negative regulation of transcription by RNA polymerase II; cytokine-mediated signaling pathway |
Sources:Amigo / QuickGO
Orthologs
| Databases | NCBI: entry; OMA: entry |
| Species | Human | Mouse |
| Entrez | 6097 | 19885 |
| Ensembl | ENSG00000143365 | ENSMUSG00000028150 |
| UniProt | P51449 | P51450 |
| RefSeq (mRNA) | NM_001001523; NM_005060 | NM_001293734; NM_011281 |
| RefSeq (protein) | NP_001001523; NP_005051 | NP_001280663; NP_035411 |
| Location (UCSC) | Chr 1: 151.81 – 151.83 Mb | Chr 3: 94.28 – 94.31 Mb |
| PubMed search |
- Wikidata
| View/Edit Human | View/Edit Mouse |

RAR-related orphan receptor gamma (RORγ) is a protein that in humans is encoded by the RORC (RAR-related orphan receptor C) gene. RORγ is a member of the nuclear receptor family of transcription factors. It is mainly expressed in immune cells (Th17 cells) and it also regulates circadian rhythms. It may be involved in the progression of certain types of cancer.

== Gene expression ==
Two isoforms are produced from the same RORC gene, probably by selection of alternative promoters.

- RORγ (also referred to as RORγ1) – produced from an mRNA containing exons 1 to 11.
- RORγt (also known as RORγ2) – produced from an mRNA identical to that of RORγ, except that the two 5'-most exons are replaced by an alternative exon, located downstream in the gene. This causes a different, shorter N-terminus.

=== RORγ ===
The mRNA of the first isoform, RORγ is expressed in many tissues, including thymus, lung, liver, kidney, muscle, and brown fat. While RORγ mRNA is abundantly expressed, attempts to detect RORγ protein have not been successful; therefore it is not clear whether RORγ protein is actually expressed. Consistent with this, the main phenotypes identified in RORγ-/- knockout mice (where neither isoform is expressed) are those associated with RORγt immune system function and an isoform specific RORγt knockout displayed a phenotype identical to the RORγ-/- knockout. On the other hand, circadian phenotypes of RORγ-/- mice in tissues where the RORγt isoform is expressed in minute amounts argues for the expression of functional RORγ isoform. Absent protein in previous studies may be due to the high amplitude circadian rhythm of expression of this isoform in some tissues.

The mRNA is expressed in various peripheral tissues, either in a circadian fashion (e.g., in the liver and kidney) or constitutively (e.g., in the muscle).

In contrast to other ROR genes, the RORC gene is not expressed in the central nervous system.

=== RORγt ===
The second isoform, RORγt, is expressed in various immune cells. Of those, the most prominent examples are immature CD4^{+}/CD8^{+} thymocytes, T helper 17 (Th17) cells and in type 3 innate lymphoid cells (ILC3). Mice lacking RORγt are devoid of lymph nodes and Peyer's patches due to the lack of Lymphoid tissue inducer cells (LTi), a subpopulation of ILC3s and important drivers of lymphoid organogenesis. RORγt inhibitors are under development for the treatment of autoimmune diseases such as psoriasis and rheumatoid arthritis.

== Function ==
The RORγ protein is a DNA-binding transcription factor and is a member of the NR1 subfamily of nuclear receptors. Although the specific functions of this nuclear receptor have not been fully characterized yet, some roles emerge from the literature on the mouse gene.

=== Circadian rhythms ===
The RORγ isoform appears to be involved in the regulation of circadian rhythms. This protein can bind to and activate the promoter of the ARNTL (BMAL1) gene, a transcription factor central to the generation of physiological circadian rhythms. Also, since the levels of RORγ are rhythmic in some tissues (liver, kidney), it has been proposed to impose a circadian pattern of expression on a number of clock-controlled genes, for example the cell cycle regulator p21. Conversely, it has also been demonstrated that RORγt^{+} enteric ILC3s themselves are under circadian control, being entrained by light that is sensed by the suprachiasmatic nucleus. Importantly, the deletion of ARNTL in ILC3s using a RORc promoter disrupted enteric defence, reinforcing the role of clock machinery in the control of RORγt. Whilst ILC3s themselves oscillate in a circadian manner and exhibit diurnal variations in the expression of clock genes, it remains unclear exactly how the central clock relays these signals to the RORγt^{+} ILC3s in the gut.

=== Immune regulation ===
RORγt is the most studied of the two isoforms. Its best understood functionality is in the immune system. The transcription factor is essential for lymphoid organogenesis in the embryo, in particular lymph nodes and Peyer's patches, but not the spleen. It is essential for the specific immune cells responsible for embryonic lymphoid formation, the Lymphoid Tissue inducer (LTi) cells. Within these cells, retinoic acid induces expression of RORc. Consequently, removing the metabolic ground product for retinoic acid, vitamin A, from the diet of pregnant mice resulted in lower embryonic LTi cell differentiation, leading to smaller lymph nodes in the adult offspring and finally resulting in lower capabilities to clear a virus. RORγt also plays an important regulatory role in thymopoiesis, by reducing apoptosis of thymocytes and promoting thymocyte differentiation into pro-inflammatory T helper 17 (Th17) cells. It also plays a role in inhibiting apoptosis of undifferentiated T cells and promoting their differentiation into Th17 cells, possibly by down regulating the expression of Fas ligand and IL2, respectively .

Despite the pro-inflammatory role of RORγt in the thymus, it is expressed in a T_{reg} cell subpopulation in the colon, and is induced by symbiotic microflora. Abrogation of the gene's activity generally increases type 2 cytokines and may make mice more vulnerable to oxazolone-induced colitis.

=== Cancer ===
RORγ is expressed in certain subsets of cancer stem cells (EpCAM+/MSI2+) in pancreatic cancer and shows a strong correlation with tumor stage and lymph node invasion. Amplification of the RORC gene has also been observed in other malignancies such as lung, breast and neuroendocrine prostate cancer.

== Ligands ==
Intermediates within the cholesterol pathway have been shown to activate RORγt. Various oxysterols are claimed to be an activator of RORγ, but with lower potency as cholesterol intermediates.

=== As a drug target ===
As antagonism of the RORγ receptor may have therapeutic applications in the treatment of inflammatory diseases, a number of synthetic RORγ receptor antagonists have been developed, including research tool compounds such as TMP778, MRL-871 and GNE-6468 and potential clinical candidates such as bevurogant, GSK2981278, PF‑06747711, JNJ‑61803534 and AZD‑0284. The dual RORγ/DHODH antagonist izumerogant is also of interest as a potential antiviral drug.

Agonists may allow the immune system to combat cancer. Cintirorgon (LYC-55716) is an oral, selective RORγ (RORgamma) agonist in clinical trials on patients with solid tumors.

== See also ==
- RAR-related orphan receptor
