= Hormone receptor =

Group of proteins

A hormone receptor is a receptor molecule that binds to a specific hormone. Hormone receptors are a wide family of proteins made up of receptors for thyroid and steroid hormones, retinoids and Vitamin D, and a variety of other receptors for various ligands, such as fatty acids and prostaglandins. Hormone receptors are of mainly two classes. Receptors for peptide hormones tend to be cell surface receptors built into the plasma membrane of cells and are thus referred to as trans membrane receptors. An example of this is Actrapid. Receptors for steroid hormones are usually found within the protoplasm and are referred to as intracellular or nuclear receptors, such as testosterone. Upon hormone binding, the receptor can initiate multiple signaling pathways, which ultimately leads to changes in the behavior of the target cells.

Hormonal therapy and hormone receptors play a very large part in breast cancer treatment (therapy is not limited to only breast cancer). By influencing the hormones, the cells' growth can be changed along with its function. These hormones can cause cancer to not survive in the human body.

== General ligand binding ==
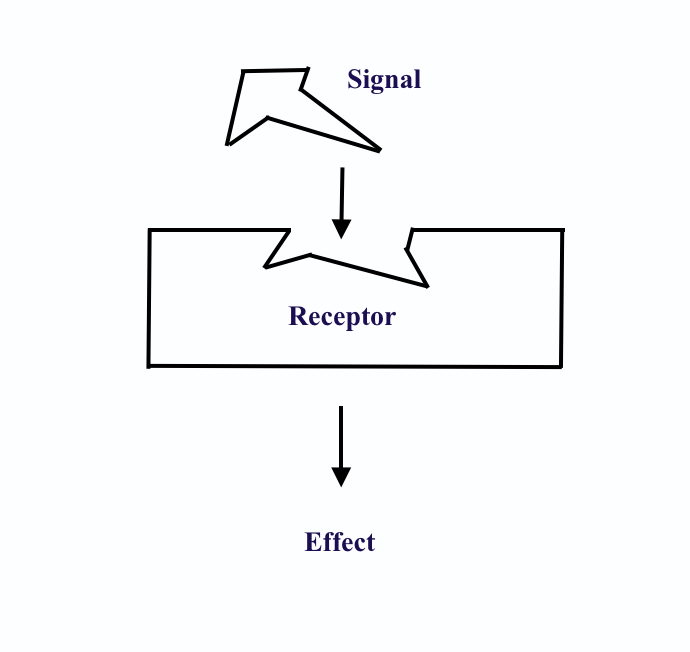
Signal molecule binds to its hormone receptor, inducing a conformational change in the receptor to begin a signaling cascade that induces a cellular response.

Hormone receptor proteins bind to a hormone as a result of an accumulation of weak interactions. Because of the relatively large size of enzymes and receptors, the large amount of surface area provides the basis for these weak interactions to occur. This binding is actually highly specific because of the complementarity of these interactions between polar, non-polar, charged, neutral, hydrophilic, or hydrophobic residues. Upon binding, the receptor often undergoes a conformational change and may bind further, signaling ligands to activate a signaling pathway. Because of these highly specific and high affinity interactions between hormones and their receptors, very low concentrations of hormone can produce significant cellular response. Receptors can have various different structures depending on the function of the hormone and the structure of its ligand. Therefore, hormone binding to its receptor is a complex process that can be mediated by cooperative binding, reversible and irreversible interactions, and multiple binding sites.

== Functions ==
=== Transmission of signal ===
The presence of hormone or multiple hormones enables a response in the receptor, which begins a cascade of signaling. The hormone receptor interacts with different molecules to induce a variety of changes, such as an increase or decrease of nutrient sources, growth, and other metabolic functions. These signaling pathways are complex mechanisms mediated by feedback loops where different signals activate and inhibit other signals. If a signaling pathway ends with the increase in production of a nutrient, that nutrient is then a signal back to the receptor that acts as a competitive inhibitor to prevent further production. Signaling pathways regulate cells through activating or inactivating gene expression, transport of metabolites, and controlling enzymatic activity to manage growth and functions of metabolism.

==== Intracellular receptors ====
Intracellular and nuclear receptors are a direct way for the cell to respond to internal changes and signals. Intracellular receptors are activated by hydrophobic ligands that pass through the cellular membrane. All nuclear receptors are very similar in structure, and are described with intrinsic transcriptional activity. Intrinsic transcriptional involves the three following domains: transcription-activating, DNA-binding, and ligand-binding. These domains and ligands are hydrophobic and are able to travel through the membrane. The movement of macromolecules and ligand molecules into the cell enables a complex transport system of intracellular signal transfers through different cellular environments until response is enabled. Nuclear receptors are a special class of intracellular receptor that specifically aid the needs of the cell to express certain genes. Nuclear receptors often bind directly to DNA by targeting specific DNA sequences in order to express or repress transcription of nearby genes.

==== Cell surface receptors ====
The extracellular environment is able to induce changes within the cell. Hormones, or other extracellular signals, are able to induce changes within the cell by binding to cell surface receptors also known as transmembrane receptors. This interaction allows the hormone receptor to produce second messengers within the cell to aid response. Second messengers may also be sent to interact with intracellular receptors in order to enter the complex signal transport system that eventually changes cellular function.

G-protein-coupled membrane receptors (GPCR) are a major class of transmembrane receptors. The features of G proteins include GDP/GTP binding, GTP hydrolysis and guanosine nucleotide exchange. When a ligand binds to a GPCR the receptor changes conformation, which makes the intracellular loops between the different membrane domains of the receptor interact with G proteins. This interaction causes the exchange of GDP for GTP, which triggers structural changes within the alpha subunit of the G protein. The changes interrupts the interaction of the alpha subunit with the beta–gamma complex and which results in a single alpha subunit with GTP bound and a beta–gamma dimer. The GTP–alpha monomer interacts with a variety of cellular targets. The beta–gamma dimer also can stimulate enzymes within the cells for example, adenylate cyclase but it does not have as many targets as the GTP–alpha complex.

=== Aiding gene expression ===
Hormone receptors can behave as transcription factors by interacting directly with DNA or by cross-talking with signaling pathways. This process is mediated through co-regulators. In the absence of ligand, receptor molecules bind corepressors to repress gene expression, compacting chromatin through histone deacetylatase. When a ligand is present, nuclear receptors undergo a conformational change to recruit various coactivators. These molecules work to remodel chromatin. Hormone receptors have highly specific motifs that can interact with coregulator complexes. This is the mechanism through which receptors can induce regulation of gene expression depending on both the extracellular environment and the immediate cellular composition. Steroid hormones and their regulation by receptors are the most potent molecule interactions in aiding gene expression.

Problems with nuclear receptor binding as a result of shortages of ligand or receptors can have drastic effects on the cell. The dependency on the ligand is the most important part in being able to regulate gene expression, so the absence of ligand is drastic to this process. For example, estrogen deficiency is a cause of osteoporosis and the inability to undergo a proper signaling cascade prevents bone growth and strengthening. Deficiencies in nuclear receptor-mediated pathways play a key role in the development of disease, like osteoporosis.

when a ligand binds to a nuclear receptor, the receptor undergoes a conformational change that causes it to become activated, which in turn affects how much gene expression is regulated.

== Classification ==
=== Receptors for water-soluble hormones ===
Water-soluble hormones include glycoproteins, catecholamines, and peptide hormones composed of polypeptides, e.g. thyroid-stimulating hormone, follicle-stimulating hormone, luteinizing hormone and insulin. These molecules are not lipid-soluble and therefore cannot diffuse through cell membranes. Consequently, receptors for peptide hormones are located on the plasma membrane because they have bound to a receptor protein located on the plasma membrane.

Water-soluble hormones come from amino acids and are located and stored in endocrine cells until actually needed.

The main two types of transmembrane receptor hormone receptor are the G-protein-coupled receptors and the enzyme-linked receptors. These receptors generally function via intracellular second messengers, including cyclic AMP (cAMP), cyclic GMP (cGMP), inositol 1,4,5-trisphosphate (IP3) and the calcium (Ca^{2+})-calmodulin system.

=== Receptors for lipid-soluble hormones ===
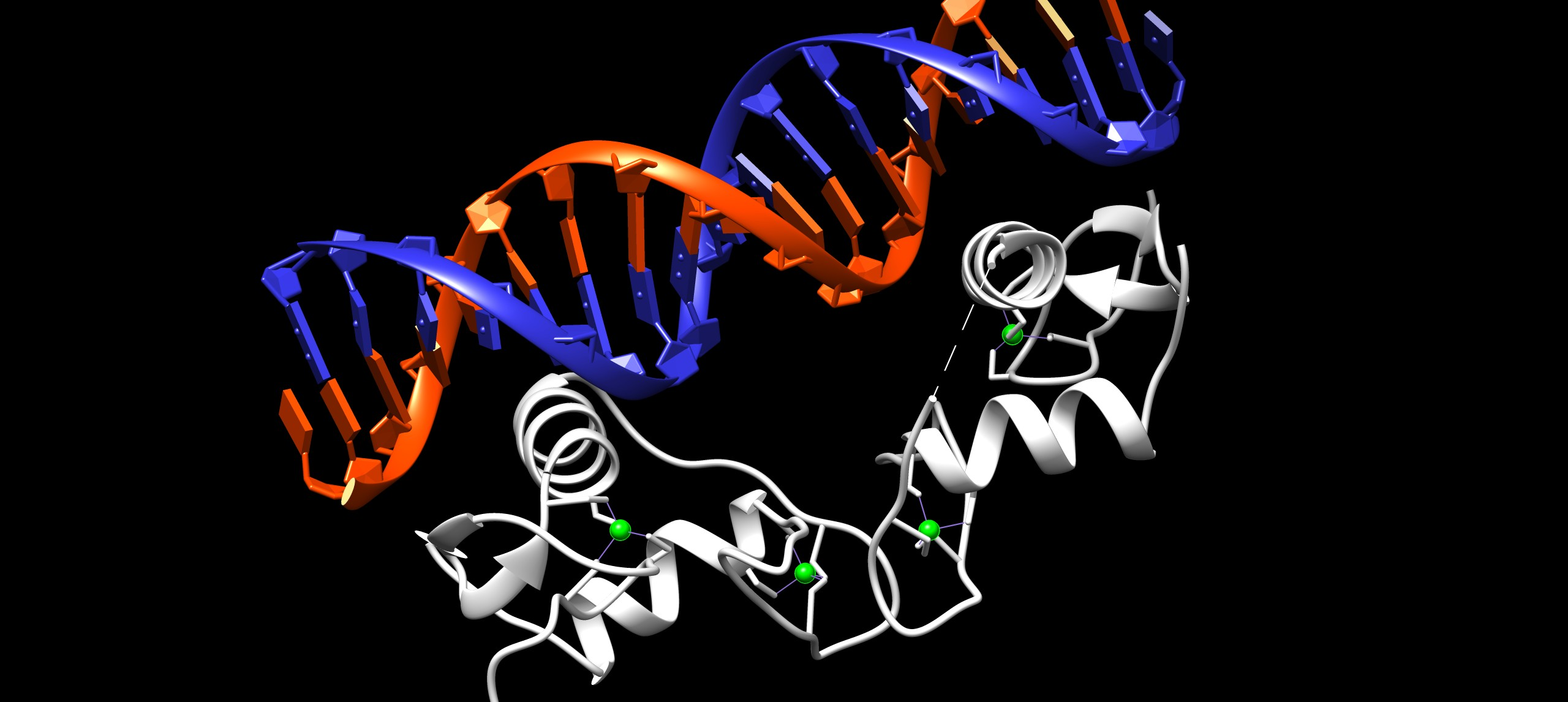
Cartoon representation of the human hormone estrogen receptor DBD. DNA = orange and blue. DBD of estrogen receptor = white. Zinc atoms = green.

Steroid hormone receptors and related receptors are generally soluble proteins that function through gene activation. Lipid-soluble hormones target specific sequences of DNA by diffusing into the cell. When they have diffused into the cell, they bind to receptors (intracellular), and migrate into the nucleus. Their response elements are DNA sequences (promoters) that are bound by the complex of the steroid bound to its receptor. The receptors themselves are zinc-finger proteins. These receptors include those for glucocorticoids (glucocorticoid receptors), estrogens (estrogen receptors), androgens (androgen receptors), thyroid hormone (T3) (thyroid hormone receptors), calcitriol (the active form of vitamin D) (calcitriol receptors), and the retinoids (vitamin A) (retinoid receptors). Receptor-protein interactions induce the uptake and destruction of their respective hormones in order to regulate their concentration in the body. This is especially important for steroid hormones because many body systems are entirely steroid dependent.

== List of hormone receptors ==
For some of these classes, in any given species (such as, for example, humans), there is a single molecule encoded by a single gene; in other cases, there are several molecules in the class.

- Androgen receptors
- Calcitriol receptors
- Corticotropin-releasing hormone receptor 1
- Corticotropin releasing hormone receptor 2
- Estrogen receptors
- Follicle-stimulating hormone receptors
- Glucagon receptors
- Gonadotropin receptors
- Gonadotropin-releasing hormone receptors
- Growth hormone receptors
- Insulin receptor
- Luteinizing hormone
- Progesterone receptors
- Retinoid receptors
- Somatostatin receptors
- Thyroid hormone receptors
- Thyrotropin receptors
