= NME2 =

Protein-coding gene in the species Homo sapiens

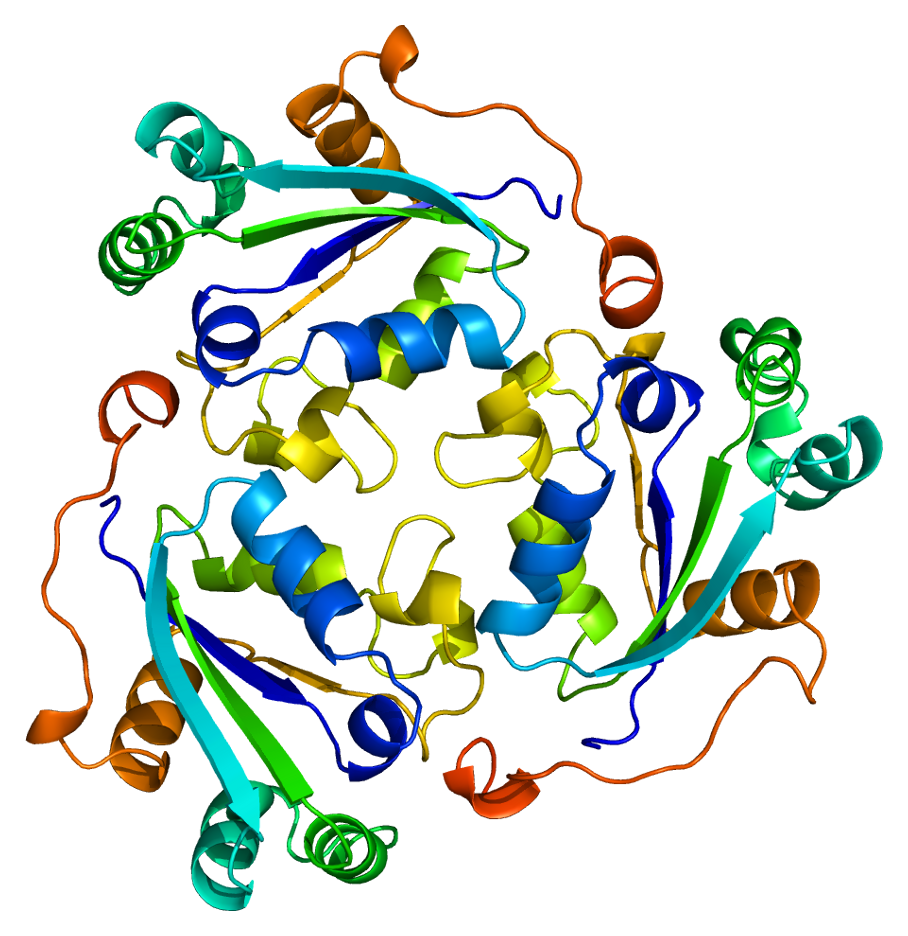

Identifiers
- Aliases: NME2, NDKB, NDPK-B, NDPKB, NM23-H2, NM23B, PUF, NME/NM23 nucleoside diphosphate kinase 2
- External IDs: OMIM: 156491; MGI: 97356; GeneCards: NME2
Available structures
| PDB | Ortholog search: PDBe RCSB |
| PDB | List of PDB id codes 3BBB, 3BBF, 1NSK, 3BBC, 1NUE |
Enzyme activity
| EC # | BRENDA | ExPASy | KEGG | MetaCyc |
|---|---|---|---|---|
| 2.7.4.6 | ↗ | ↗ | ↗ | ↗ |
| 2.7.13.3 | ↗ | ↗ | ↗ | ↗ |

Gene location (Human)
| Chr. | Chromosome 17 (human) |
| Band | 17q21.33 | Start | 51,165,435 bp |
| Band | 17q21.33 | End | 51,171,744 bp |

Gene location (Mouse)
| Chr. | Chromosome 11 (mouse) |
| Band | 11|11 D | Start | 93,840,640 bp |
| Band | 11|11 D | End | 93,847,085 bp |
RNA expression pattern
| Bgee | Human / Mouse (ortholog); Top expressed in: left ovary; skin of abdomen; skin of leg; left coronary artery; canal of the cervix; mucosa of esophagus; mucosa of transverse colon; lactiferous gland; right ovary; body of pancreas / Top expressed in: right kidney; epiblast; pancreas; quadriceps femoris muscle; morula; human kidney; islet of Langerhans; muscle tissue; embryo; embryo; More reference expression data |
| BioGPS | n/a |
Gene ontology
| Molecular function | transferase activity; DNA binding; nucleotide binding; protein histidine kinase activity; DNA-binding transcription factor activity; metal ion binding; kinase activity; protein binding; ATP binding; nucleoside diphosphate kinase activity; protein serine/threonine kinase activity; fatty acid binding; intermediate filament binding; enzyme binding; transcription coactivator activity; GDP binding; G-quadruplex DNA binding |
| Cellular component | cytoplasm; cytosol; cell projection; focal adhesion; ruffle; extracellular exosome; nucleus; cell periphery; lamellipodium; extracellular region; secretory granule lumen; ficolin-1-rich granule lumen; intermediate filament; mitochondrial membranes; perinuclear region of cytoplasm |
| Biological process | UTP biosynthetic process; peptidyl-histidine phosphorylation; nucleobase-containing small molecule interconversion; CTP biosynthetic process; regulation of transcription, DNA-templated; phosphorylation; positive regulation of epithelial cell proliferation; positive regulation of keratinocyte differentiation; negative regulation of apoptotic process; nucleotide metabolic process; nucleoside diphosphate phosphorylation; transcription, DNA-templated; cell adhesion; nucleoside triphosphate biosynthetic process; integrin-mediated signaling pathway; GTP biosynthetic process; regulation of epidermis development; positive regulation of transcription by RNA polymerase II; neutrophil degranulation; negative regulation of myeloid leukocyte differentiation; positive regulation of neuron projection development; cellular response to oxidative stress; protein autophosphorylation; protein complex oligomerization; response to growth hormone; cellular response to glucose stimulus; cellular response to fatty acid; adenylate cyclase-activating G protein-coupled receptor signaling pathway; positive regulation of transcription, DNA-templated |
Sources:Amigo / QuickGO
Orthologs
| Databases | NCBI: entry; OMA: entry |
| Species | Human | Mouse |
| Entrez | 4831 | 18103 |
| Ensembl | ENSG00000243678 | ENSMUSG00000020857 |
| UniProt | P22392 | Q01768 |
| RefSeq (mRNA) | NM_002512; NM_001018137; NM_001018138; NM_001018139; NM_001198682 | NM_001077529; NM_008705 |
| RefSeq (protein) | NP_001018147; NP_001018148; NP_001018149; NP_001185611; NP_002503 NP_001018146 | NP_001070997; NP_032731 |
| Location (UCSC) | Chr 17: 51.17 – 51.17 Mb | Chr 11: 93.84 – 93.85 Mb |
| PubMed search |
- Wikidata
| View/Edit Human | View/Edit Mouse |

Nucleoside diphosphate kinase B is an enzyme that in humans is encoded by the NME2 gene.

== Function ==
Nucleoside diphosphate kinase (NDK) exists as a hexamer composed of 'A' (encoded by NME1) and 'B' (encoded by this gene) isoforms. Multiple alternatively spliced transcript variants encoding the same isoform have been found for this gene. Co-transcription of this gene and the neighboring upstream gene (NME1) generates naturally occurring transcripts (NME1-NME2) which encode a fusion protein consisting of sequence sharing identity with each individual gene product.

== Interactions ==
NME2 has been shown to interact with NME3 and HERC5.
