= ZNF821 =

Zinc Finger 821

Identifiers
- Aliases: ZNF821, zinc finger protein 821
- External IDs: MGI: 1923121; GeneCards: ZNF821

Gene location (Human)
Chr.	Chromosome 16 (human)
Band	16q22.2	Start	71,859,680 bp
Band	16q22.2	End	71,895,336 bp

Gene location (Mouse)
Chr.	Chromosome 8 (mouse)
Band	8|8 D3	Start	110,432,178 bp
Band	8|8 D3	End	110,451,564 bp
RNA expression pattern
Bgee	Human / Mouse (ortholog); Top expressed in: ganglionic eminence; cerebellar hemisphere; left testis; right hemisphere of cerebellum; right testis; ventricular zone; prefrontal cortex; anterior pituitary; oocyte; testicle / Top expressed in: saccule; otic vesicle; ventricular zone; ganglionic eminence; otic placode; spermatid; Rostral migratory stream; granulocyte; zygote; secondary oocyte; More reference expression data
BioGPS	n/a
Gene ontology
Molecular function	DNA-binding transcription factor activity; DNA binding; protein binding; metal ion binding; nucleic acid binding
Cellular component	nucleus; nucleoplasm; extracellular region
Biological process	regulation of transcription, DNA-templated; transcription, DNA-templated; positive regulation of transcription by RNA polymerase II; negative regulation of endopeptidase activity
Sources:Amigo / QuickGO
Orthologs
Databases	NCBI: entry; OMA: entry
Species	Human	Mouse
Entrez	55565	75871
Ensembl	ENSG00000102984	ENSMUSG00000031728
UniProt	O75541	Q6PD05
RefSeq (mRNA)	NM_001201552; NM_001201553; NM_001201554; NM_001201556; NM_017530 NM_001318238; NM_001318239; NM_001376297; NM_001376298; NM_001376299; NM_001376300	NM_001167946; NM_001286391; NM_001286393; NM_029468; NM_001363380 NM_001363381; NM_001363382; NM_001363383; NM_001363384; NM_001363385; NM_001363386
RefSeq (protein)	NP_001188481; NP_001188482; NP_001188483; NP_001188485; NP_001305167 NP_001305168; NP_060000; NP_001363226; NP_001363227; NP_001363228; NP_001363229	NP_001161418; NP_001273320; NP_001273322; NP_083744; NP_001350309 NP_001350310; NP_001350311; NP_001350312; NP_001350313; NP_001350314; NP_001350315
Location (UCSC)	Chr 16: 71.86 – 71.9 Mb	Chr 8: 110.43 – 110.45 Mb
PubMed search
- Wikidata
View/Edit Human	View/Edit Mouse

Zinc Finger Protein 821, also known as ZNF821, is a protein encoded by the ZNF821 gene. This gene is located on the 16th chromosome and is expressed highly in the testes, moderately expressed in the brain and low expression in 23 other tissues. The protein encoded is 412 amino acids long with 2 Zinc Finger motifs (C2H2 type) and a 23 amino acid long STPR domain.

== Gene ==
=== Locus ===
ZNF821 is located at 16q22.2 on the minus strand, it is composed of 35,657 bases spanning from base 71,893,583 to 71,929,239. ZNF821 has 8 exons and is located in the same neighborhood as 4 other genes, ATXNL1, IST1, PKD1L3, AP1G1.

=== Transcriptional Regulation ===
Transcription of ZNF821 is handled by the promoter GXP_9784938 which is 539 bases long and located from base 71,884,046 to 71,884,585. The promoter region begins 404 base pairs upstream of the beginning of transcription. Several transcription factors with scores greater than 0.9 are predicted to regulate ZNF821 expression.

Transcription factor	Abbreviation	Binding Site	Strand
Myeloid zinc finger protein	MZF1	GTGGGGATCCG	+
Cyclin D binding myb-like transcription factor	DMTF	CACCCCTAGGCCCGA	-
Early growth response 2	EGRF	GAGAGGGGGTGCCTGCGGC	+
Human acute myelogenous leukemia factors	HAML	AGCTGTGGTTGGGGG	+
C2H2 zinc finger transcription factors 2	ZF02	GACTTGAGCTACCACCCCATTCT	-
Hypoxia-response elements	HIFF	CCATCCCACCGCAAATGTGCAGGTC	-
Ets variant 1	ETSF	CACGTCCAGGAAGGTCTGGGG	+
Homeobox transcription factor Nanog	HOXF	ACCCGGGAATGGGCGAGGC	+
GLIS family zinc finger 3	GLIF	CGCTCCGCCCCCCAAGG	-
GTF2I-like repeat 4 of GTF3	GUCE	CGGGATTGGGC	+
zinc finger protein with KRAB and SCAN domains 12	ZF07	GGAGCCCCTCCTCTCCA	+
Myc associated zinc finger protein	MAZF	GTCTCGGGGAGAGGAGTCCGGGGCGGGTGTT	-
Zinc finger and BTB domain containing 14	VF5F	CGGTCCGCGCGCGGCCC	+ , -
Transcription factor II B (TFIIB) recognition element	TF2B	CCGCGCC	-
Zinc finger protein 37 alpha	ZF37	CCTCCCCCT	-
E2F transcription factor 1	E2FF	CGCGCGAGGGCGGCGGG	-
Cas-interacting zinc finger	CIZF	GTAGAAAAAGG	-
Sma- and Mad-related proteins	SMAD	TCTGTCTGTCT	+
SRY (sex determining region Y)-box 6	SORY	CAGACAGACAGACGACAACCGAAACAGGCAG	-

=== Expression ===
ZNF821 is highly expressed in the testes, almost 2.5 times as much as in the brain, the next most highly expressed in tissue. Expression in the brain is primarily during fetal development, with lower levels of expression occurring in the cerebellum. There are low levels of expression in most other tissues.

== mRNA ==
=== Variants and Isoforms ===
ZNF821 has 7 different transcript variants and 4 isoforms. Variant 1 Isoform 1 is the second longest and but most abundant of all the variants and isoforms. While variant 2 is longer, it contains one fewer exon. Variant 1, Isoform 1 is 1987 bases long with a 5' UTR 415 bases long and a 3' UTR 433 bases long.

Variant	Isoform	Length	# of Exons
1	1	1987	8
2	1	2005	7
3	2	1894	7
4	2	1879	6
5	3	1853	7
6	4	1959	8
7	4	1722	7

== Protein ==
=== Characteristics ===
The protein encoded by the ZNF821 gene is 412 amino acids long with a calculated molecular weight of ~ 47 kDa and a predicted isoelectric point of 6.14. Compared to the rest of the human proteome, there are decreased amounts of Isoleucine and Tyrosine residues as well as increased levels of Arginine residues.

=== Structure ===
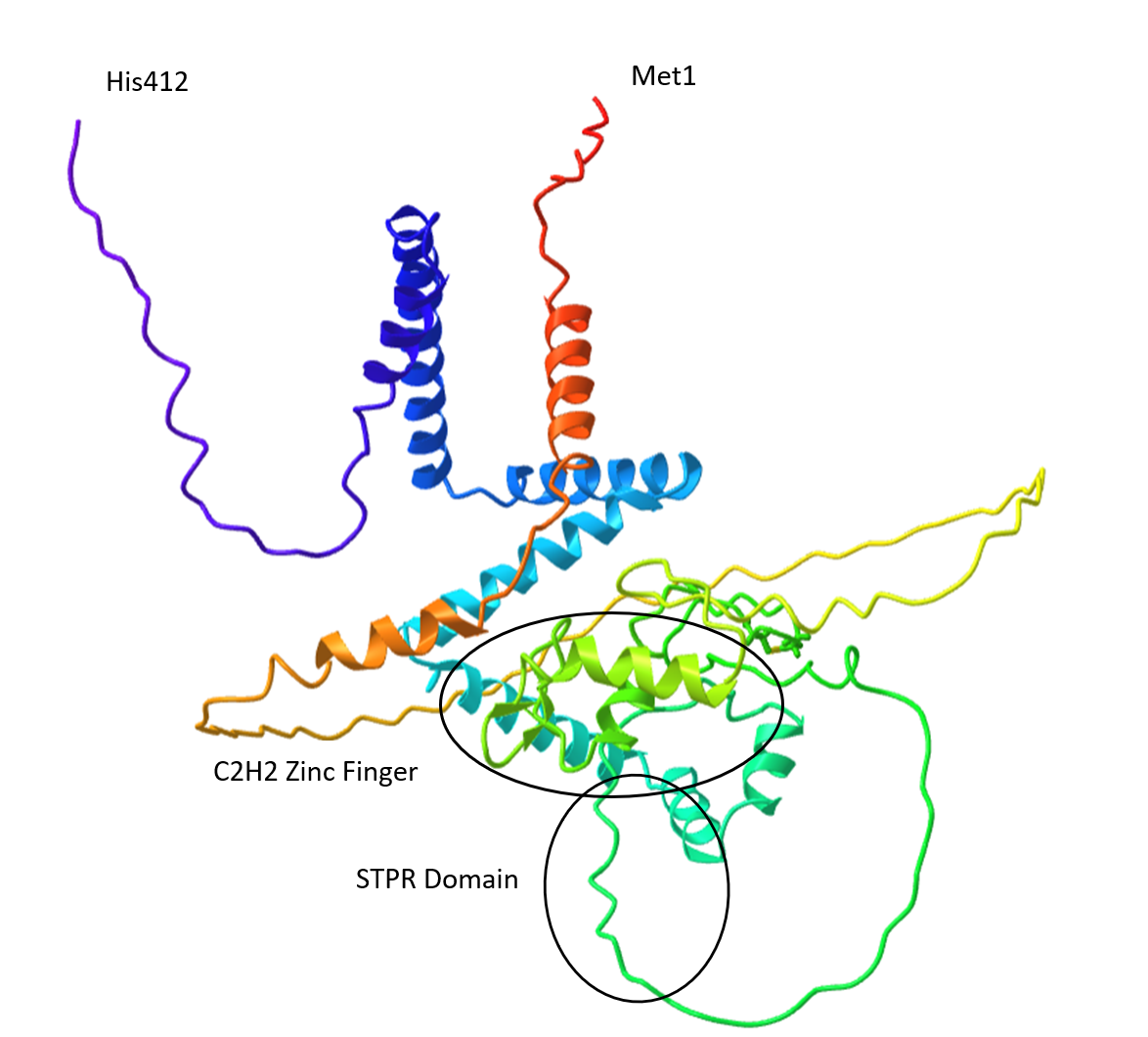
AlphaFold prediction of ZNF821 Protein.

ZNF821 protein contains two C2H2 Zinc Finger motifs (spanning amino acids 120-140 and 152–172, respectively) and an STPR (one-score-and-three-amino acid peptide repeat) domain (spanning amino acids 223–314) containing a bipartite nuclear localization signal. This STPR domain is a double-stranded DNA-binding domain with similar traits to the silkworm FMBP-1 STPR domain and is thought to be responsible for the nuclear localization of the ZNF821 protein. The secondary structure of the ZNF821 protein is composed of several alpha helical structures along with two small regions of beta sheets. The tertiary structure of the ZNF821 protein provides exposure of the Zinc Fingers for presumed DNA-binding.

=== Cellular Localization ===
The ZNF821 protein binds to DNA making it highly likely to be localized to the nucleus, there is also a bipartite nuclear localization sequence from Lys280 to Arg297, Lys304 to Leu320, and Lys338 to Arg354. An analysis of the subcellular localization in both close and distant orthologs resulted in a >99% chance of being localized to the nucleus for all orthologs.

=== Regulation ===
The ZNF821 protein is predicted to be modified post-translationally at several different positions. When compared with both close and distant orthologous sequences two phosphorylation sites are conserved, the Serine at position 2 and the Threonine at position 7. It is also predicted by several sources to have further phosphorylation sites of the Serine at position 254 and the Tyrosine at position 279.

=== Interactions ===
Several proteins have been shown to interact with the ZNF821 protein, many of them relating to transcriptional regulation.

Abbreviation	Protein Name	Identification Method	Function
ATM	ATM Serine/Threonine kinase	Two Hybrid Array	Activates checkpoint signaling upon sensing DNA damage
CCDC85B	Coiled-coil domain-containing protein 85B	Two Hybrid Pooling	Transcriptional Repressor
SMARCA2	Probable global transcription activator SNF2L2	Two Hybrid Pooling	Transcriptional activation and repression by chromatin remodeling
CDCA7L	Cell division cycle-associated 7-like protein	Two Hybrid Array	Transcriptional Repressor
PIM2	Serine/threonine-protein kinase Pim-2	Two Hybrid Array	Proto-oncogene
DVL3	Segment polarity protein dishevelled homolog DVL-3	Two Hybrid Array	Cell signal transduction
RUNDC3A	RUN domain-containing protein 3A	Two Hybrid Array	Effector of RAPA2A
FXR1	Fragile X mental retardation syndrome-related protein 1	Two Hybrid Pooling	RNA-binding protein

== Homology ==
=== Paralogs ===
ZNF821 has no paralogs in humans.

=== Orthologs ===
There are orthologs for ZNF821 across vertebrates, but none for the protein in invertebrates. The Zinc Finger motifs are conserved into invertebrates. The STPR domain is only present in mammals.

Genus	Species	Common name	Taxonomy	Date of Divergence (MYA)	Sequence length (AA)	Sequence identity (%)
Homo	sapiens	Human	Primates	0.00	412	100.00
Pongo	abelii	Sumatran Orangutan	Primates	15.20	412	99.76
Lacerta	agilis	Sand lizard	Squamata	318.00	429	76.33
Chrysemys	picta bellii	Western Painted turtle	Testudines	318.00	411	87.65
Gopherus	evgoodei	Sinaloan desert tortoise	Testudines	318.00	413	86.44
Antrostomus	carolinensis	Chuck-will's-widow	Caprimulgiformes	318.00	411	86.20
Apteryx	rowi	Okarito kiwi	Apterygiformes	318.00	482	87.41
Leptosomus	discolor	Cuckoo roller	Leptosomiformes	318.00	410	85.68
Xenopus	laevis	Two-lined caecilian	Gymnophiona	351.70	409	76.76
Geotrypetes	seraphini	Gaboon caecilian	Gymnophiona	351.70	378	75.26
Bufo	bufo	Common toad	Anura	351.70	395	66.75
Rhinatrema	bivittatum	African clawed frog	Anura	351.70	398	69.64
Pygocentrus	nattereri	Red-bellied piranha	Characiformes	433.00	456	48.58
Cyprinus	carpio	Common Carp	Cypriniformes	433.00	441	49.56
Polypterus	senegalus	Senegal bichir	Polypteriformes	433.00	539	54.59
Erpetoichthys	calabaricus	Reedfish	Polypteriformes	433.00	471	49.58
Paramormyrops	kingsleyae	Old Calabar mormyrid	Osteoglossiformes	433.00	443	53.63
Carcharodon	carcharias	Great white shark	Lamniformes	465.00	360	42.07

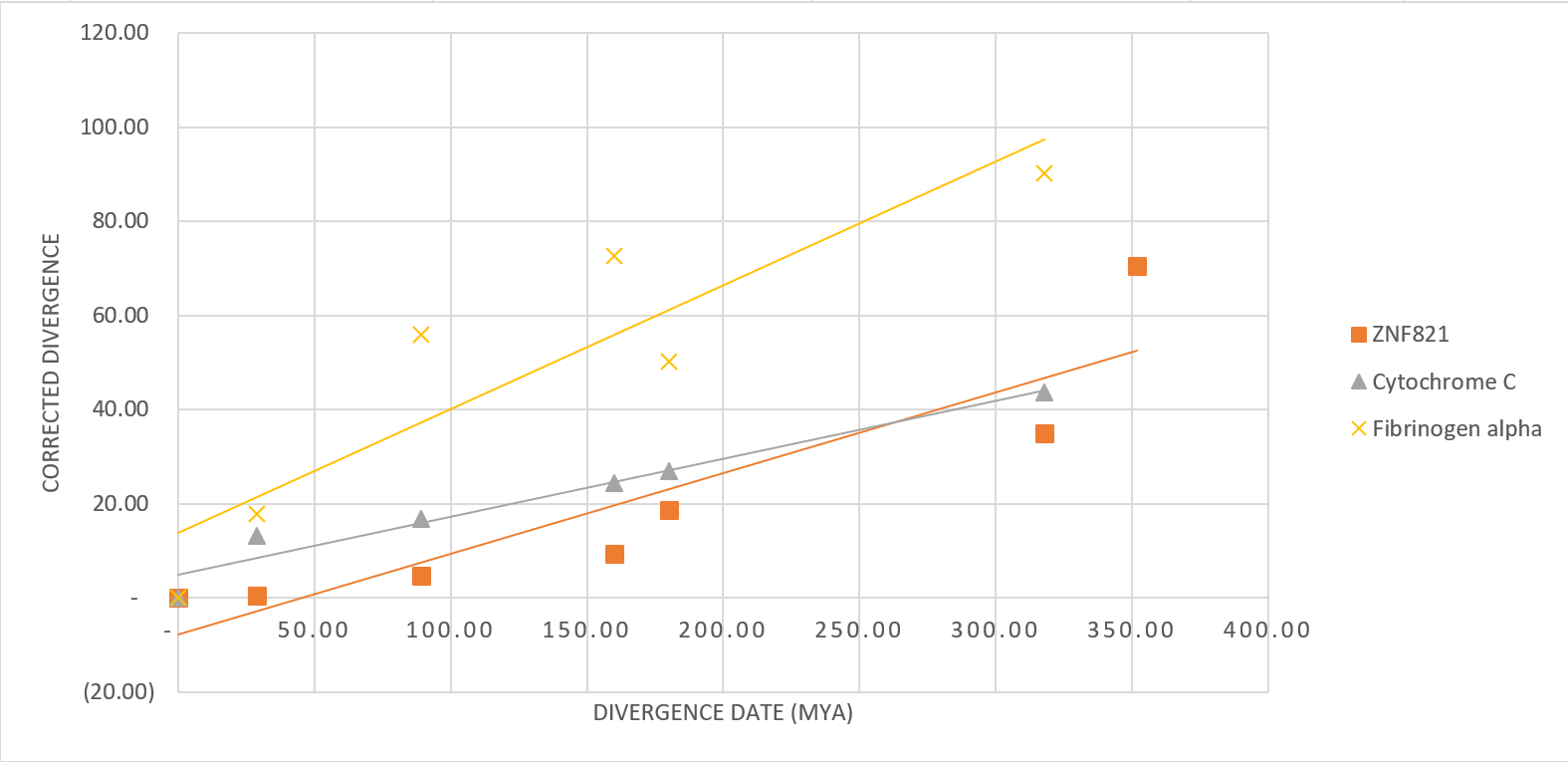
Divergence Rate of ZNF821 compared to Cytochrome c and Fibrinogen alpha.

The relative rate of divergence is slow when compared to the rates of two reference proteins, Cytochrome c and Fibrinogen alpha, but increases to slightly faster than Cytochrome c as the date of divergence gets closer to the present.

== Clinical Significance ==
ZNF821 has been associated in some capacity with several different diseases and conditions. It has been implicated in causing craniosynostosis through interactions with the transcription factor BCL11B by affecting the charges on the arginine-3, arginine-5, and lysine-3 residues, thereby increasing their conformational flexibility. It has also been found to be a possible biomarker for methamphetamine-associated psychosis (MAP) via the process of RNA-degradation. Another disease association is that with breast cancer as part of a DNA-repair sub network. ZNF821 was found to be dysregulated among breast cancer patients. Finally, there is a study showing an increase in methylation over time on ZNF821 in Parkinson's disease patients who did not receive L-dopa/entacapone. This provides a clearer view of changes due only to Parkinson's pathophysiology.
