= Stuart Orkin =

American hematologist

Stuart H. Orkin
- Born: April 23, 1946 (age 80); Manhattan, New York, U.S.
- Education: Massachusetts Institute of Technology (B.S.); Harvard Medical School (M.D.)
- Known for: Molecular genetics of blood disorders; GATA transcription factors; BCL11A and fetal hemoglobin regulation; CRISPR/Cas9 gene editing therapy (Casgevy) for sickle cell disease
- Awards: E. Mead Johnson Award (1987); Warren Alpert Foundation Prize (1993); Jessie Stevenson Kovalenko Medal (2013); William Allan Award (2014); George M. Kober Medal (2018); Nemmers Prize (2018); King Faisal Prize (2020); Gruber Prize in Genetics (2021); Canada Gairdner International Award (2022); Shaw Prize (2024); Breakthrough Prize in Life Sciences (2026)
- Scientific career
- Fields: Hematology, Pediatric oncology, Stem cell biology
- Workplaces: Boston Children's Hospital; Dana–Farber Cancer Institute; Harvard Medical School
- Academic advisors: Philip Leder
- Notable students: Jean-Pierre Bourquin

Stuart Holland Orkin (born April 23, 1946) is an American physician-scientist specializing in hematology, pediatric oncology, and stem cell biology. He is the David G. Nathan Distinguished Professor of Pediatrics at Harvard Medical School and an Investigator of the Howard Hughes Medical Institute (HHMI) at Boston Children's Hospital. Orkin is known for defining the molecular basis of human blood disorders, discovering key hematopoietic transcription factors, and pioneering gene therapy and gene editing approaches for sickle cell disease and thalassemia. He is a member of the National Academy of Sciences and the Institute of Medicine.

== Early life and education ==
Born in 1946 in New York, Orkin grew up in Manhattan, New York, where his father was a urologist. He earned a B.S. in biology from the Massachusetts Institute of Technology in 1967 and an M.D. from Harvard Medical School in 1972. From 1973 to 1975, he was a U.S. Public Health Service Research Associate in the Laboratory of Molecular Genetics at the National Institutes of Health under geneticist Philip Leder. He then completed residency and fellowship training in pediatrics and pediatric hematology/oncology at Boston Children's Hospital and the Dana–Farber Cancer Institute. While Orkin was completing his training in hematology-oncology, his department chair, David G. Nathan, allowed him to establish his own research laboratory.

== Career ==
Orkin joined the faculty of Harvard Medical School in 1978, becoming Assistant Professor of Pediatrics, and rose to the rank of full professor in 1986. He was named an HHMI Investigator in 1986, a position he continues to hold. From 2000 to 2016, he served as Chair of Pediatric Oncology at the Dana–Farber Cancer Institute. In 2017, he was appointed the David G. Nathan Distinguished Professor of Pediatrics at Harvard Medical School.

== Research ==
In the 1970s and 1980s, Orkin identified genetic mutations associated with the thalassemia syndromes, providing the first comprehensive molecular description of an inherited disorder. In 1986, he and collaborators cloned a gene responsible for chronic granulomatous disease, the first example of positional cloning of a human disease gene without prior knowledge of its protein product. His laboratory subsequently cloned the first hematopoietic transcription factor, GATA1, and later defined the roles of the GATA family in blood cell development and cancer.

In 1985, David Ginsburg, then a fellow in Orkin's laboratory, cloned cDNA encoding von Willebrand factor (vWF), which later enabled the development of recombinant vWF therapies.

Beginning in 2008, Orkin and colleagues identified BCL11A as a key repressor of fetal hemoglobin (HbF). His group later showed that silencing BCL11A could reverse sickle cell pathology in mice. In 2013 and 2015, Orkin published findings in Science and Nature, respectively, that described DNA regulatory elements as potential therapeutic targets for gene therapy in sickle cell disease. His foundational research on BCL11A paved the way for the first approved CRISPR/Cas9-based gene-editing therapy, Casgevy, for sickle cell disease and β-thalassemia. His group continues to define the molecular biology of BCL11A, including showing that it functions as a tetramer in hemoglobin regulation.

== Service to science ==
Orkin has served on several national committees addressing genetics and biomedical research policy. In 1987, he was a member of the National Research Council committee on the Mapping and Sequencing of the Human Genome, which provided a blueprint for the Human Genome Project.

In 1995, at the request of Harold Varmus, then director of the National Institutes of Health, Orkin co-chaired (with Arno Motulsky) the Panel to Assess the NIH Investment in Research on Gene Therapy. The panel issued a report that highlighted the limited rigor of existing gene therapy studies and emphasized the need to strengthen fundamental science in the field, a redirection later credited with enabling future advances.

From 2005 to 2008, Orkin served as the inaugural chair of the California Institute for Regenerative Medicine's Grants Working Group, which reviewed research funding applications. He was later recognized by the Institute for his leadership and contributions.

== Honors and awards ==
- 1986 – William Dameshek Prize, American Society of Hematology
- 1987 – E. Mead Johnson Award
- 1991 – Elected to the National Academy of Sciences
- 1992 – Elected to the National Academy of Medicine
- 1993 – Elected Fellow of the American Academy of Arts and Sciences
- 1993 – Warren Alpert Foundation Prize
- 1995 – Helmut Horten Foundation Prize
- 1998 – E. Donnall Thomas Lecture and Prize, American Society of Hematology
- 2005 – Distinguished Research Award, Association of American Medical Colleges
- 2009 – Mentor Awards, American Society of Hematology
- 2013 – Jessie Stevenson Kovalenko Medal, National Academy of Sciences
- 2014 – William Allan Award, American Society of Human Genetics
- 2016 – Karl Landsteiner Memorial Award, American Association of Blood Banks
- 2017 – Elected member of the American Philosophical Society
- 2018 – George M. Kober Medal, Association of American Physicians
- 2018 – Mechthild Esser Nemmers Prize in Medical Science, Northwestern University
- 2020 – King Faisal Prize in Medicine
- 2020 – Harrington Prize for Innovation in Medicine
- 2021 – Tobias Prize Lecture, International Society for Stem Cell Research
- 2021 – Gruber Prize in Genetics
- 2022 – Canada Gairdner International Award
- 2023 – Society of Memorial Sloan Kettering Prize
- 2023 – George Stamatoyannopoulos Mentorship Award, American Society of Gene and Cell Therapy
- 2023 – Honorary Doctorate, Université de Montréal
- 2024 – Elaine Redding Brinster Prize in Science or Medicine
- 2024 – Ernest Beutler Lecture and Prize, American Society of Hematology
- 2024 – Shaw Prize in Life Science and Medicine
- 2024 – Time100 and Time100 Health lists (2024)
- 2026 – Breakthrough Prize in Life Sciences
- 2026 – Warren Alpert Foundation Prize

== Personal ==
Orkin has been married to Roslyn W. Orkin, a developmental biologist, for more than 50 years and has one daughter.

== Selected publications ==
- Orkin, SH; Alter, BP; Altay, C; Mahoney, MJ; Lazarus, H; Hobbins, JC; Nathan, DG (July 27, 1978). "Application of endonuclease mapping to the analysis and prenatal diagnosis of thalassemias caused by globin-gene deletion". N Engl J Med. 299 (4): 166–172. doi:10.1056/NEJM197807272990403. PMID 661890.
- Treisman, R; Orkin, SH; Maniatis, T (April 14, 1983). "Specific transcription and RNA splicing defects in five cloned beta-thalassaemia genes". Nature. 302 (5909): 591–596. doi:10.1038/302591a0. PMID 6188062.
- Ginsburg, D; Handin, RI; Bonthron, DT; Donlon, TA; Bruns, GA; Latt, SA; Orkin, SH (June 21, 1985). "Human von Willebrand factor (vWF): isolation of complementary DNA (cDNA) clones and chromosomal localization". Science. 228 (4706): 1401–1406. doi:10.1126/science.3874428. PMID 3874428.
- Tsai, SF; Martin, DI; Zon, LI; D'Andrea, AD; Wong, GG; Orkin, SH (June 8, 1989). "Cloning of cDNA for the major DNA-binding protein of the erythroid lineage through expression in mammalian cells". Nature. 339 (6224): 446–451. doi:10.1038/339446a0. PMID 2725678.
- Royer-Pokora, B; Kunkel, LM; Monaco, AP; Goff, SC; Newburger, PE; Baehner, RL; Cole, FS; Curnutte, JT; Orkin, SH (July 3–9, 1986). "Cloning the gene for an inherited human disorder—chronic granulomatous disease—on the basis of its chromosomal location". Nature. 322 (6074): 32–38. doi:10.1038/322032a0. hdl:2027.42/62926. PMID 2425263.
- Xu, J; Peng, C; Sankaran, VG; Shao, Z; Esrick, EB; Chong, BG; Ippolito, GC; Fujiwara, Y; Ebert, BL; Tucker, PW; Orkin, SH (November 18, 2011). "Correction of sickle cell disease in adult mice by interference with fetal hemoglobin silencing". Science. 334 (6058): 993–996. doi:10.1126/science.1211053. PMC 3746545. PMID 21998251.
- Canver, MC; Smith, EC; Sher, F; Pinello, L; Sanjana, NE; Shalem, O; Chen, DD; Schupp, PG; Vinjamur, DS; Garcia, SP; Luc, S; Kurita, R; Nakamura, Y; Fujiwara, Y; Maeda, T; Yuan, GC; Zhang, F; Orkin, SH; Bauer, DE (November 12, 2015). "BCL11A enhancer dissection by Cas9-mediated in situ saturating mutagenesis". Nature. 527 (7577): 192–197. doi:10.1038/nature15521. PMC 4644101. PMID 26375006.
- Zheng, G; Yin, M; Mehta, S; Chu, IT; Wang, S; AlShaye, A; Drainville, K; Buyanbat, A; Bienfait, F; Tenglin, K; Zhu, Q; Orkin, SH (November 29, 2024). "A tetramer of BCL11A is required for stable protein production and fetal hemoglobin silencing". Science. 386 (6725): 1010–1018. doi:10.1126/science.adp3025. PMID 39607926.
