= Raffaele Renella =

Swiss pediatric hematologist-oncologist

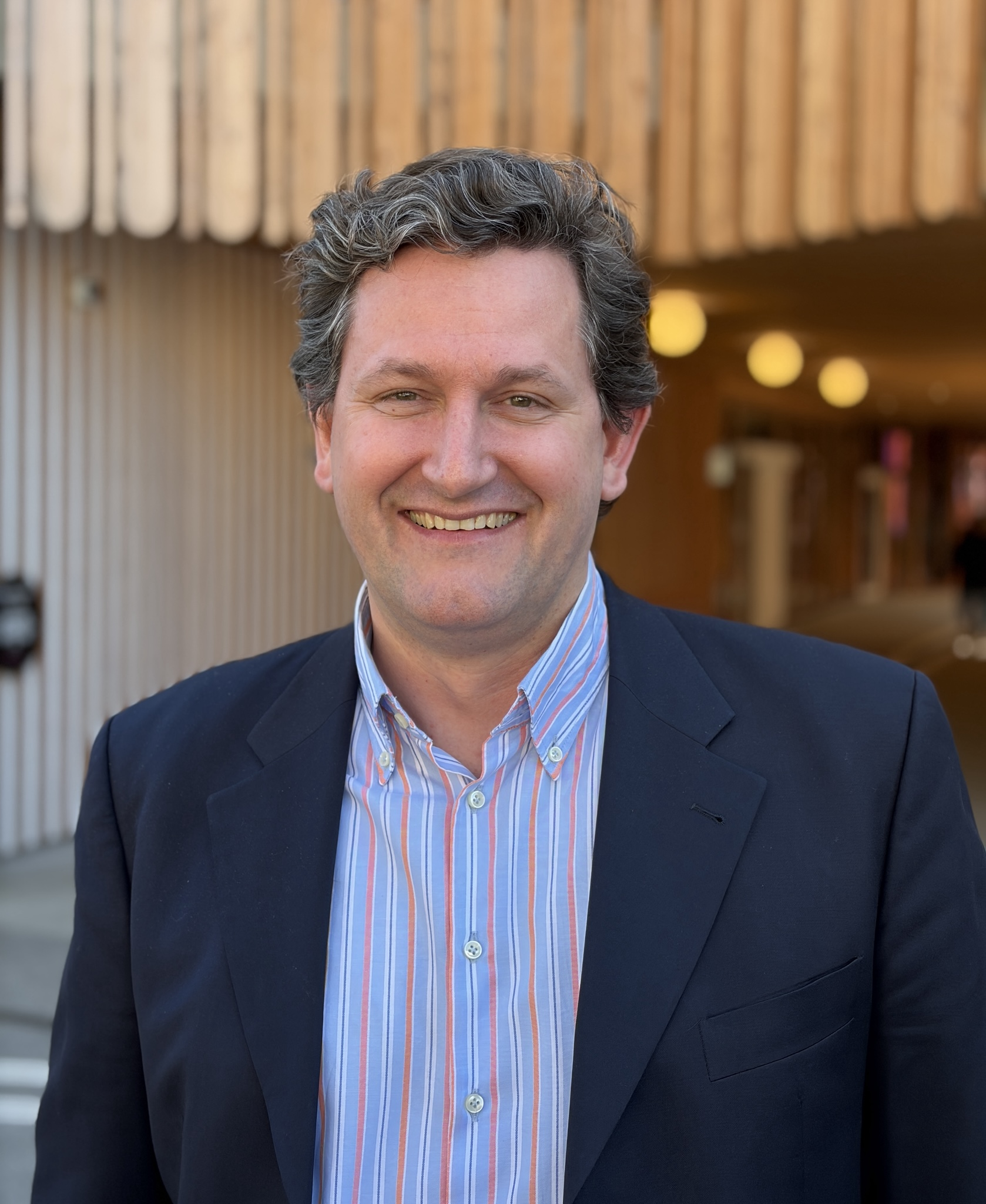
- Education: Medicine (MD); Molecular Hematology (PhD/DPhil)
- Alma mater: University of Geneva; University of Oxford
- Known for: Research on pediatric bone marrow failure, Pediatric myelodysplasia and embryonal cancers (neuroblastoma), Gene therapy for blood disorders
- Awards: Lord Florey Scholarship (2005)
- Scientific career
- Fields: Pediatric hematology and oncology Hematopoiesis; Neuroblastoma; Gene therapy
- Institutions: Lausanne University Hospital (CHUV); University of Lausanne (UNIL); Boston Children's Hospital; Dana-Farber Cancer Institute
- Thesis: (2009)
- Doctoral advisor: William G. Wood; Douglas R. Higgs
- Other academic advisors: Alain Fischer; David A. Williams

Raffaele Renella (born 1976 in Basel) is a Swiss pediatric hematologist and oncologist. He is an associate professor at the University of Lausanne (UNIL) and the head of the Pediatric Hematology-Oncology Unit at the Lausanne University Hospital (CHUV). His research focuses on the molecular and cellular causes of pediatric cancers and blood disorders, with a specific interest in anomalies of hematopoietic stem cell development, neuroblastic tumors/neuroblastoma, and the development of gene and cell therapies. In 2026, he was appointed as the co-director of the Swiss NCCR "Children & Cancer" funded by the SNSF.

== Career ==
Renella obtained his Medical Degree (MD) from the University of Geneva. He completed his residency in pediatrics at the Lausanne University Hospital (CHUV). In 2004, he undertook specialized training in pediatric hematology, immunology, and stem cell transplantation at the Hôpital Necker-Enfants Malades in Paris, working in the unit led by Alain Fischer.

From 2005 to 2009, Renella pursued a PhD with William G. Wood and Douglas R. Higgs in Molecular Hematology at the University of Oxford (Weatherall Institute of Molecular Medicine). As a Lord Florey Scholar at Lincoln College, he conducted research on congenital dyserythropoietic anemia. During this period, he also served as an Honorary Specialist Registrar at the John Radcliffe Hospital.

In 2010, Renella relocated to the United States for a clinical and research fellowship in Pediatric Hematology-Oncology and Stem Cell Transplantation at Boston Children's Hospital, the Dana-Farber Cancer Institute, and Harvard Medical School. He conducted postdoctoral research in the laboratory of David A. Williams. From 2013 to 2014, he joined the faculty of Harvard Medical School and served as an Instructor of Pediatrics at Harvard Medical School and an Attending Staff Physician at Boston Children's Hospital and Dana-Farber.

Renella returned to Switzerland in 2015, assuming the role of Attending Physician in the Pediatric Hematology-Oncology Unit at CHUV and was appointed Head of the Pediatric Hematology-Oncology Research Laboratory (LHOP) at CHUV and University of Lausanne. In August 2023, he was appointed Head of the Pediatric Hematology-Oncology Unit (Chef de service) at CHUV. Concurrently, he serves as the Pediatric Hematology Group Leader at the LHOP. He holds board certifications from the Swiss Medical Association (FMH) in Pediatrics and Pediatric Hematology-Oncology, and is a Fellow of the Royal College of Paediatrics and Child Health (FRCPCH).

In 2026, he was appointed as co-director along with Jean-Pierre Bourquin (as director) in the newly created National Centre of Competence in Research (NCCR) "Children & Cancer" project funded by the SNSF with a total funding of almost CHF 34 million over four years.

== Research ==
Renella leads a research group affiliated with the University of Lausanne and the Swiss Cancer Center Léman (SCCL).

His research investigates cancer and blood disorders in children and fosters the development of targeted gene and cell therapy approaches. His work specifically investigates the molecular mechanisms behind embryonal pediatric cancers (neuroblastoma) and complex genetic blood disorders (bone marrow failure), myelodysplastic syndromes, and hemoglobinopathies.

Renella was involved in the discovery of a childhood neutropenia syndrome caused by mutations in the SEPT6 gene. With Andrea Superti-Furga, he also described a bone dysplasia presenting with immune dysregulation, and participated the discovery of mutations in ACP5 as its molecular cause.

He has contributed to research on lineage-specific BCL11A knockdown strategies to reverse the sickle cell phenotype and has studied the genetic basis of congenital dyserythropoietic anemias.

He also participates in the development of clinical guidelines, including for children, adolescents and adults with autistic spectrum disorders undergoing cancer treatments.

He is a member of the Swiss Pediatric Oncology Group (SPOG) and the European Hematology Association.

== Distinctions ==
- Fellow of the Royal College of Paediatrics and Child Health (FRCPCH)
- 2012: ASH Outstanding Abstract Achievement Awards
- 2005: Lord Florey Scholarship (Berrow Foundation), Lincoln College, University of Oxford

== Selected works ==
- Sepporta, Maria-Vittoria; Praz, Viviane; Balmas Bourloud, Katia; Joseph, Jean-Marc; Jauquier, Nicolas; Riggi, Nicolò; Nardou-Auderset, Katya; Petit, Audrey; Scoazec, Jean-Yves; Sartelet, Hervé; Renella, Raffaele; Mühlethaler-Mottet, Annick (2022-01-12). "TWIST1 expression is associated with high-risk neuroblastoma and promotes primary and metastatic tumor growth". Communications Biology. 5 (1): 42. doi:10.1038/s42003-021-02958-6. ISSN 2399-3642. PMC 8755726. PMID 35022561.
- Vivancos Stalin, Lucie; Gualandi, Marco; Schulte, Johannes Hubertus; Renella, Raffaele; Shakhova, Olga; Mühlethaler-Mottet, Annick (2019). "Expression of the Neuroblastoma-Associated ALK-F1174L Activating Mutation During Embryogenesis Impairs the Differentiation of Neural Crest Progenitors in Sympathetic Ganglia". Frontiers in Oncology. 9 275. doi:10.3389/fonc.2019.00275. ISSN 2234-943X. PMC 6477091. PMID 31058082.
- Southan, Christopher (2014-11-29). "PMID 25415348 back-story on bioactivity dbs". doi.org. doi:10.59350/r0r6b-9tf43.
- Brendel, Christian; Guda, Swaroopa; Renella, Raffaele; Bauer, Daniel E.; Canver, Matthew C.; Kim, Young-Jo; Heeney, Matthew M.; Klatt, Denise; Fogel, Jonathan; Milsom, Michael D.; Orkin, Stuart H.; Gregory, Richard I.; Williams, David A. (2016-10-03). "Lineage-specific BCL11A knockdown circumvents toxicities and reverses sickle phenotype". The Journal of Clinical Investigation. 126 (10): 3868–3878. doi:10.1172/JCI87885. ISSN 1558-8238. PMC 5096824. PMID 27599293.
- Altrock, Philipp M.; Brendel, Christian; Renella, Raffaele; Orkin, Stuart H.; Williams, David A.; Michor, Franziska (2016-09-01). "Mathematical modeling of erythrocyte chimerism informs genetic intervention strategies for sickle cell disease". American Journal of Hematology. 91 (9): 931–937. doi:10.1002/ajh.24449. ISSN 1096-8652. PMC 5093908. PMID 27299299.
- Guda, Swaroopa; Brendel, Christian; Renella, Raffaele; Du, Peng; Bauer, Daniel E.; Canver, Matthew C.; Grenier, Jennifer K.; Grimson, Andrew W.; Kamran, Sophia C.; Thornton, James; de Boer, Helen; Root, David E.; Milsom, Michael D.; Orkin, Stuart H.; Gregory, Richard I. (2015-09-01). "miRNA-embedded shRNAs for Lineage-specific BCL11A Knockdown and Hemoglobin F Induction". Molecular Therapy: The Journal of the American Society of Gene Therapy. 23 (9): 1465–1474. doi:10.1038/mt.2015.113. ISSN 1525-0024. PMC 4817887. PMID 26080908.
- Southan, Christopher (2014-11-29). "PMID 25415348 back-story on bioactivity dbs". doi.org. doi:10.59350/n6013-31e08.
