= COUP-TFI =

Protein found in humans

NR2F1

Identifiers
- Aliases: NR2F1, BBOAS, BBSOAS, COUP-TFI, EAR-3, EAR3, ERBAL3, NR2F2, SVP44, TCFCOUP1, TFCOUP1, nuclear receptor subfamily 2 group F member 1, COUPTF1
- External IDs: OMIM: 132890; MGI: 1352451; GeneCards: NR2F1
Available structures
PDB	Ortholog search: PDBe RCSB
PDB	List of PDB id codes 2EBL

Gene location (Human)
Chr.	Chromosome 5 (human)
Band	5q15	Start	93,583,222 bp
Band	5q15	End	93,594,611 bp

Gene location (Mouse)
Chr.	Chromosome 13 (mouse)
Band	13 C1|13 41.38 cM	Start	78,337,092 bp
Band	13 C1|13 41.38 cM	End	78,347,876 bp
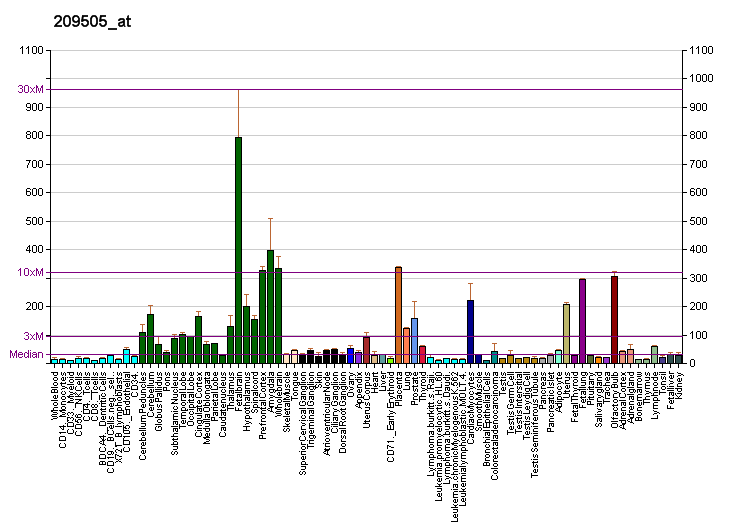

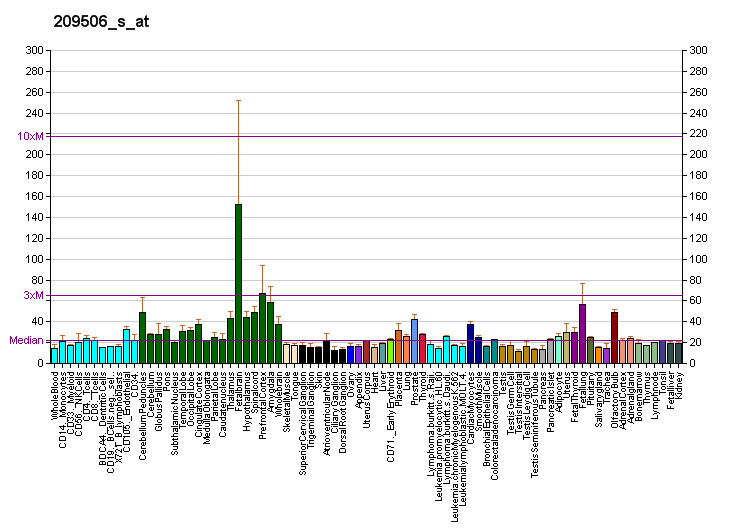
RNA expression pattern
Bgee	Human / Mouse (ortholog); Top expressed in: ventricular zone; optic nerve; seminal vesicula; trigeminal ganglion; left uterine tube; germinal epithelium; ganglionic eminence; parietal pleura; lower lobe of lung; primary visual cortex / Top expressed in: vestibular membrane of cochlear duct; lateral geniculate nucleus; anterior amygdaloid area; barrel cortex; medial dorsal nucleus; ventricular zone; vas deferens; saccule; ciliary body; subiculum; More reference expression data
BioGPS	More reference expression data
Gene ontology
Molecular function	DNA-binding transcription factor activity; steroid hormone receptor activity; sequence-specific DNA binding; transcription coactivator activity; DNA binding; nuclear receptor activity; zinc ion binding; protein binding; metal ion binding; RNA polymerase II cis-regulatory region sequence-specific DNA binding; DNA-binding transcription repressor activity, RNA polymerase II-specific; DNA-binding transcription factor activity, RNA polymerase II-specific; retinoic acid-responsive element binding
Cellular component	nucleus; nucleoplasm; cytosol
Biological process	transcription initiation from RNA polymerase II promoter; regulation of transcription, DNA-templated; negative regulation of transcription by RNA polymerase II; transcription, DNA-templated; signal transduction; steroid hormone mediated signaling pathway; intracellular receptor signaling pathway; positive regulation of nucleic acid-templated transcription; nervous system development; negative regulation of neuron projection development; positive regulation of transcription by RNA polymerase II
Sources:Amigo / QuickGO
Orthologs
Databases	NCBI: entry; OMA: entry
Species	Human	Mouse
Entrez	7025	13865
Ensembl	ENSG00000175745	ENSMUSG00000069171
UniProt	P10589	Q60632
RefSeq (mRNA)	NM_005654	NM_010151; NM_001347538; NM_001347539
RefSeq (protein)	NP_005645	NP_001334467; NP_001334468; NP_034281; NP_001390702; NP_001390704 NP_001390706
Location (UCSC)	Chr 5: 93.58 – 93.59 Mb	Chr 13: 78.34 – 78.35 Mb
PubMed search
- Wikidata
View/Edit Human	View/Edit Mouse

COUP-TF1 (COUP Transcription Factor 1) also known as NR2F1 (Nuclear Receptor subfamily 2, group F, member 1) is a protein that in humans is encoded by the NR2F1 gene. This protein is an orphan nuclear receptor, but studies suggest that it acts as a key transcription regulator in the early embryonic development of the eye and optical nervous system.

== Function ==
Coup (chicken ovalbumin upstream promoter) transcription factor binds to the ovalbumin promoter and, in conjunction with another protein (S300-II) stimulates initiation of transcription. COUP-TF1 binds to both direct repeats and palindromes of the 5'-AGGTCA-3' motif.

== Interactions ==
COUP-TFI has been shown to interact with:

- BCL11A,
- BCL11B,
- COPS2, and
- ESR1.

== Clinical ==
Mutations in this gene have been associated with Bosch-Boonstra-Schaaf optic atrophy syndrome.
