= BCL11B =

Protein-coding gene in the species Homo sapiens

Identifiers
- Aliases: BCL11B, ATL1, ATL1-alpha, ATL1-beta, ATL1-delta, ATL1-gamma, CTIP-2, CTIP2, RIT1, ZNF856B, hRIT1-alpha, B-cell CLL/lymphoma 11B, IMD49, B cell CLL/lymphoma 11B, IDDFSTA, BAF complex component, BAF chromatin remodeling complex subunit SMARCM2
- External IDs: OMIM: 606558; MGI: 1929913; GeneCards: BCL11B

Gene location (Human)
Chr.	Chromosome 14 (human)
Band	14q32.2	Start	99,169,287 bp
Band	14q32.2	End	99,272,197 bp

Gene location (Mouse)
Chr.	Chromosome 12 (mouse)
Band	12 F1|12 59.1 cM	Start	107,876,662 bp
Band	12 F1|12 59.1 cM	End	107,969,861 bp
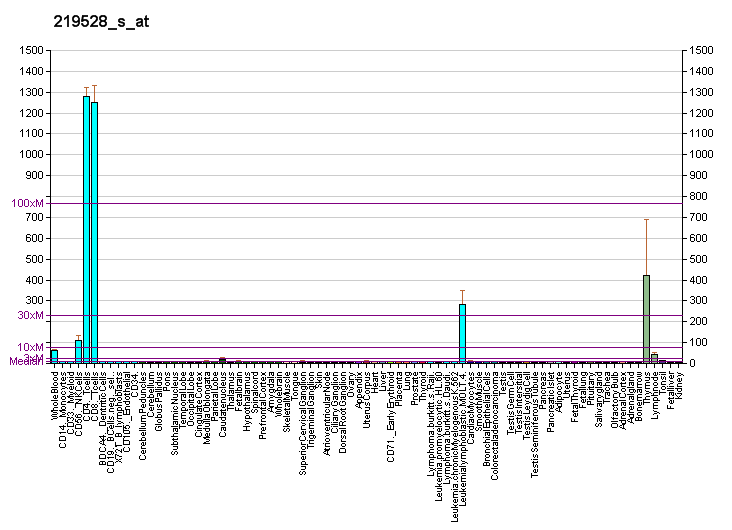
RNA expression pattern
Bgee	Human / Mouse (ortholog); Top expressed in: thymus; skin of thigh; nipple; skin of hip; vulva; buccal mucosa cell; secondary oocyte; skin of arm; ganglionic eminence; gums / Top expressed in: dorsal striatum; Rostral migratory stream; medial ganglionic eminence; Region I of hippocampus proper; olfactory tubercle; nucleus accumbens; thymus; temporal lobe; globus pallidus; amygdala; More reference expression data
BioGPS	More reference expression data
Gene ontology
Molecular function	sequence-specific DNA binding; DNA-binding transcription activator activity, RNA polymerase II-specific; metal ion binding; RNA polymerase II cis-regulatory region sequence-specific DNA binding; protein binding; nucleic acid binding; DNA-binding transcription factor activity, RNA polymerase II-specific; DNA-binding transcription factor activity
Cellular component	intracellular anatomical structure; neuron projection; nucleus
Biological process	commitment of neuronal cell to specific neuron type in forebrain; regulation of neuron differentiation; neurogenesis; olfactory bulb axon guidance; regulation of transcription, DNA-templated; T cell differentiation in thymus; axonogenesis; epithelial cell morphogenesis; thymus development; T cell receptor V(D)J recombination; negative regulation of apoptotic process; transcription by RNA polymerase II; post-embryonic development; positive T cell selection; transcription, DNA-templated; striatal medium spiny neuron differentiation; odontogenesis of dentin-containing tooth; regulation of lipid metabolic process; keratinocyte development; post-embryonic camera-type eye development; central nervous system neuron differentiation; regulation of gene expression; alpha-beta T cell differentiation; regulation of keratinocyte proliferation; signal transduction; negative regulation of cell population proliferation; positive regulation of transcription by RNA polymerase II; skin development; hematopoietic stem cell migration; lymphoid lineage cell migration into thymus
Sources:Amigo / QuickGO
Orthologs
Databases	NCBI: entry; OMA: entry
Species	Human	Mouse
Entrez	64919	58208
Ensembl	ENSG00000127152	ENSMUSG00000048251
UniProt	Q9C0K0	Q99PV8
RefSeq (mRNA)	NM_001282237; NM_001282238; NM_022898; NM_138576	NM_001079883; NM_001286343; NM_021399
RefSeq (protein)	NP_001269166; NP_001269167; NP_075049; NP_612808	NP_001073352; NP_001273272; NP_067374
Location (UCSC)	Chr 14: 99.17 – 99.27 Mb	Chr 12: 107.88 – 107.97 Mb
PubMed search
- Wikidata
View/Edit Human	View/Edit Mouse

B-cell lymphoma/leukemia 11B is a protein that in humans is encoded by the BCL11B gene.

== Gene location ==
BCL11B is located on human chromosome 14p32.2. The mouse analogue is called Rit1 or Bcl11b and is located on mouse chromosome 12.

== Function ==
This gene encodes a Cys_{2}His_{2}-type zinc finger protein and is closely related to BCL11A, a gene whose translocation may be associated with B-cell malignancies. The specific function of this gene has not yet been determined, but it could also be involved in some malignancies. Two alternatively spliced transcript variants, which encode distinct isoforms, have been reported.

Research suggests that BCL11B is crucial for ameloblasts (the cells that produce tooth enamel) to form and work properly.

== Interactions ==
BCL11B has been shown to interact with COUP-TFI.

== Pathology ==
BCL11B is closely connected with immune regulation and for so its mutation can lead to a SCID phenotype. This so-called Immunodeficiency 49 (OMIM #617237) is classified as T-B+NK+ SCID. It is characterised by a lack of T lymphocytes and its malfunctioning specifically in proliferative response. On the other hand, B cells and NK cells counts and functions are not impaired. The symptoms of SCID caused by BCL11B mutation - apart from immunity defects - typically include teeth abnormalities, craniofacial dimorphism, different types of dermatitis. As well the intellectual development is significantly impaired. The disease has a very early onset and the only known treatment is hematopoietic stem cell transplantation from a healthy donor. The immunodeficiency has a dominant negative mode of inheritance as all so far described patients with it has been after sequencing identified as heterozygotes in the BCL11B gene.

== Research projects ==
A mouse model based study showed, that Bcl11b also plays an important role in pathogenesis of inflammatory bowel disease. Bcl11b gene knock-out in certain T cell population led to development of IBD. The mechanisms behind are supposed to be reduced suppressor activity of T regulatory cells and changes in cytokine environment. Bcl11b is suspected to interact with Foxp3 and IL10 gene promoters and thus impair its suppressive function in the intestines.

Bcl11b (mouse analogue of human BCL11B) has been proven to contribute to malignant growth for example in case of mouse lymphomas. That is suspected to be caused by interaction with p53, a well-known tumor suppressor gene.
