= Raphael Morscher =

Austrian pediatric oncologist and metabolism researcher

Raphael Johannes Morscher
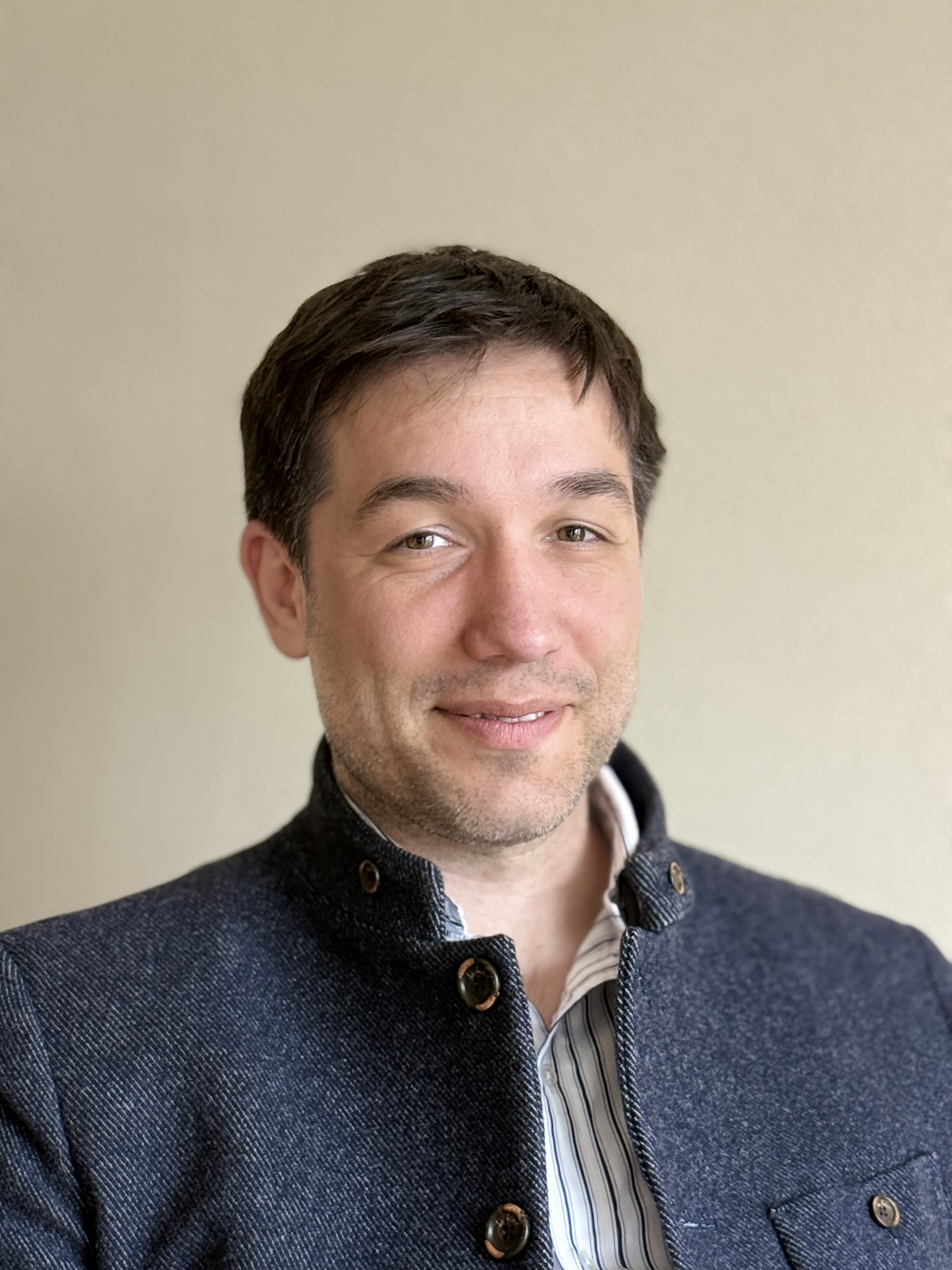
- Raphael Morscher in 2026
- Born: [], Austria
- Citizenship: Austrian
- Education: Paracelsus Medical University; Princeton University
- Known for: Cancer metabolism research, in vivo stable isotope tracing
- Awards: EMBO Young Investigator (2025); Prof. Dr. Max Cloëtta Research Position (2025)
- Scientific career
- Fields: Pediatric oncology; Cancer metabolism; Precision medicine
- Workplaces: University of Zurich; University Children's Hospital Zurich; Princeton University
- Doctoral advisor: Barbara Kofler
- Other academic advisors: Matthias Baumgartner; Joshua Rabinowitz; Jean-Pierre Bourquin
- Website: www.morscherlab.org

Raphael Johannes Morscher is an Austrian pediatric oncologist and physician-scientist specializing in cancer metabolism and precision medicine. He holds the Prof. Dr. Max Cloëtta research position in pediatric cancer metabolism at the University of Zurich and serves as an attending physician at the University Children's Hospital Zurich. Morscher's research focuses on the metabolic regulation of protein translation and cell identity in childhood cancers, utilizing multi-omic integration and metabolic flux analysis via in vivo stable isotope tracing.

== Early life and education ==
Morscher studied human medicine at the Paracelsus Medical University (PMU) in Salzburg from 2007 to 2012. During his medical studies, he completed clinical rotations at Boston Children's Hospital, Charité Berlin, and the University Children's Hospital Zurich.

His MD thesis investigated 3-methylcrotonyl-CoA carboxylase deficiency, a rare inborn error of metabolism, and supervised by Matthias Baumgartner at the University of Zurich. He graduated magna cum laude with a Doctor of Medicine (MD) degree from the PMU in 2012.

Morscher subsequently completed his doctoral research in molecular medicine at PMU Salzburg under the supervision of Barbara Kofler. His work focused on metabolic vulnerabilities in neuroblastoma, specifically the impact of ketogenic diets and calorie restriction on tumor progression. This training was complemented by an eight-month research stay at Princeton University as a visiting student-research collaborator. In 2017, he received his PhD with the Promotio sub auspiciis Praesidentis rei publicae, an Austrian state honor awarded for outstanding academic achievement across secondary and tertiary education.

== Career and research ==
Between 2013 and 2016, Morscher held residency and fellowship positions in human genetics at the University Clinic Salzburg and the Medical University of Innsbruck. From 2016 to 2017, he was a Postdoctoral Research Fellow with Joshua Rabinowitz at the Lewis-Sigler Institute for Integrative Genomics at Princeton University. During this period, he studied the metabolic regulation of translation in mitochondria and contributed to the development of in vivo stable isotope tracing to quantify metabolic fluxes in living organisms.

In 2018, Morscher joined the University Children's Hospital Zurich, obtaining board certification in pediatrics in 2021. Following pediatric oncology fellowships at the Gustave Roussy Cancer Campus in France and Kispi, he was appointed as a Group Leader at the University of Zurich in 2022, where he established the Pediatric Cancer Metabolism Laboratory. Since 2024, he has served as an attending physician in pediatric oncology, focusing on solid tumors such as neuroblastoma.

A primary objective of his laboratory is the development of metabolic depletion strategies to treat pediatric malignancies by identifying targetable vulnerabilities in cancer metabolic pathways.

=== Neuroblastoma and polyamine metabolism ===
Morscher's team has investigated how pharmacological inhibition of polyamine biosynthesis using eflornithine can be enhanced by the dietary restriction of amino acid substrates (arginine and proline). In preclinical models, this combination altered protein translation in neuroblastoma tumors, triggering a pro-differentiation proteome that caused the cancer cells to differentiate into mature neurons, leading to tumor regression. This research, which provided evidence that skewed codon distributions may evolve in response to metabolic states, was featured as a cover article in Nature. The findings were subsequently highlighted in opinion pieces in Nature, the New England Journal of Medicine, and Cancer Discovery.

=== Mitochondrial translation ===
Morscher's postdoctoral research helped identify the first folate-dependent macromolecule modification in mammals. He observed that folate-activated one-carbon units are required for tRNA methylation in mitochondria. Depletion of folates or the enzyme SHMT2 leads to ribosome stalling and impaired expression of respiratory chain enzymes.

=== Systemic metabolic flux ===
He also contributed to research that challenged traditional models of the Warburg effect. Using isotope tracing, the research indicated that lactate, rather than glucose, serves as a primary carbon source for the citric acid cycle in most mammalian tissues and tumors.

== Awards and honors ==
- 2012: Excellence Award, Paracelsus Medical University
- 2017: Promotio sub auspiciis Praesidentis rei publicae, Republic of Austria
- 2018: Talent Prize, Swiss Society of Paediatrics (SSP/SGP)
- 2022: Basic Research Prize, Childhood Cancer Switzerland
- 2025: EMBO Young Investigator
- 2025: Professor Dr. Max Cloëtta Research Position
- 2026: FIGHT KIDS CANCER & St. Baldrick's Foundation Arceci Innovation Award
- 2026: Georg-Friedrich-Götz-Prize

== Selected publications ==
- Cherkaoui; Morscher (2025). "Reprogramming neuroblastoma by diet-enhanced polyamine depletion". Nature. 646 (8085): 707–715. Bibcode:2025Natur.646..707C. doi:10.1038/s41586-025-09564-0. PMC 12527938. PMID 40993392.
- Morscher; Ducker; Li (2018). "Mitochondrial translation requires folate-dependent tRNA methylation". Nature. 554 (7690): 128–132. Bibcode:2018Natur.554..128M. doi:10.1038/nature25460. PMC 6020024. PMID 29364879.
- Hui; Ghergurovich; Morscher (2017). "Glucose feeds the TCA cycle via circulating lactate". Nature. 551 (7678): 115–118. Bibcode:2017Natur.551..115H. doi:10.1038/nature24057. PMC 5898814. PMID 29045397.
- Neinast; Jang; Hui; Morscher (2018). "Quantitative Analysis of the Whole-Body Metabolic Fate of Branched-Chain Amino Acids". Cell Metabolism. 29 (2): 417–429. doi:10.1016/j.cmet.2018.10.013. PMC 6365191. PMID 30449684.
- Korobkina; Morscher (2024). "GLUD1 dictates muscle stem cell differentiation by controlling mitochondrial glutamate levels". Developmental Cell. 59 (21): 2850–2865.e8. doi:10.1016/j.devcel.2024.07.015. PMID 39121856.
- Morscher; Brard (2021). "First-in-child phase I/II study of the dual mTORC1/2 inhibitor vistusertib (AZD2014)". European Journal of Cancer. 157: 225–237. doi:10.1016/j.ejca.2021.08.026. PMID 34536946.
- Moreno; Morscher (2021). "Phase I or II Study of Ribociclib in Combination With Topotecan-Temozolomide or Everolimus in Children With Advanced Malignancies". Journal of Clinical Oncology. doi:10.1200/JCO.20.02986 (inactive 21 May 2026).
