= Jean-Pierre Bourquin =

Swiss pediatric oncologist

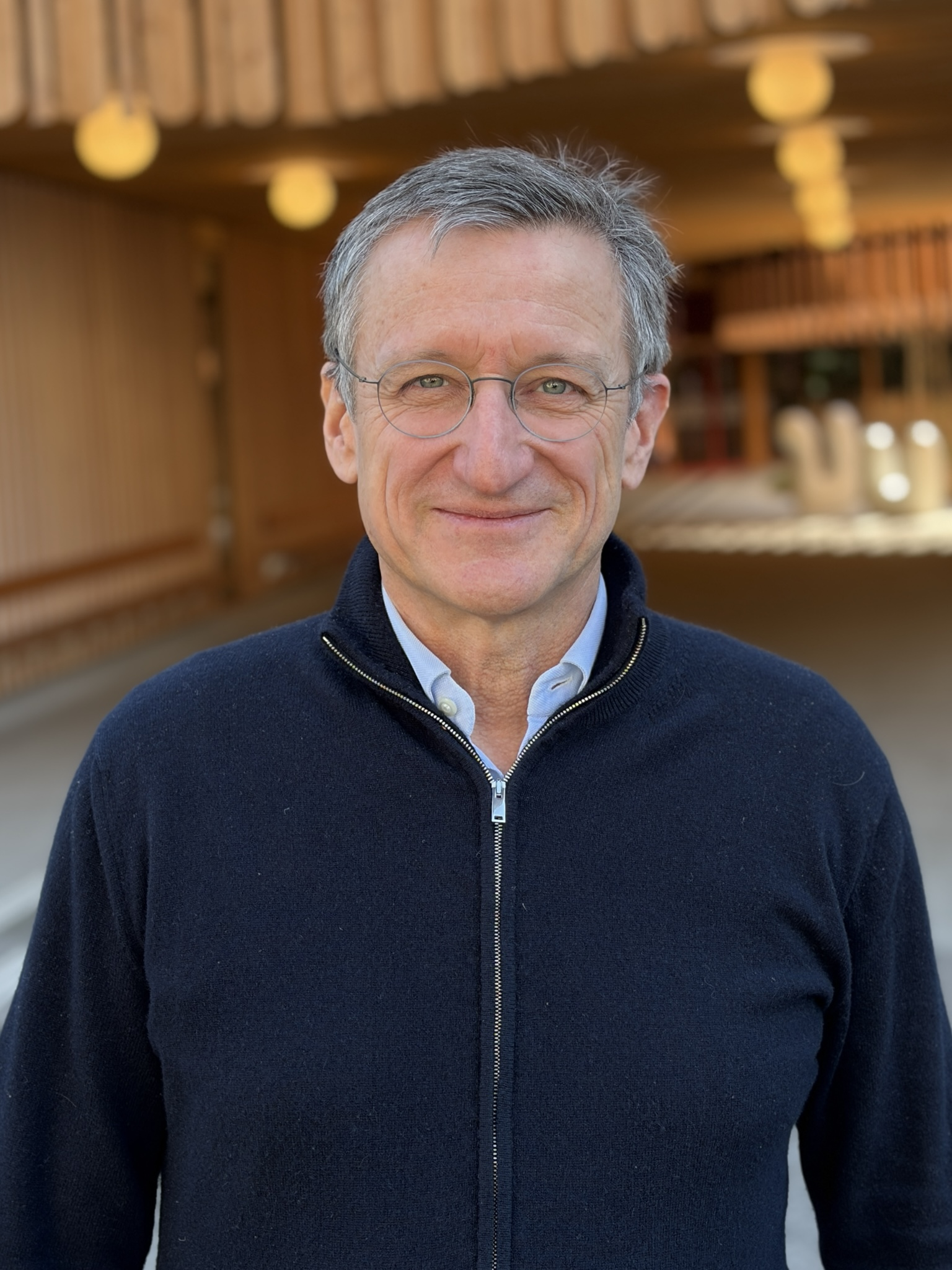
- Education: University of Zurich
- Known for: Functional Precision Oncology; Drug Response Profiling (DRP); Transcriptional and epigenetic dependencies in high-risk leukemia
- Awards: Walter and Gertrud Siegenthaler Research Award (2011); Kind-Philipp-Award (2009)
- Scientific career
- Fields: Pediatric oncology Acute lymphoblastic leukemia Precision medicine Cancer Research
- Workplaces: University Children's Hospital Zurich; University of Zurich; Dana-Farber Cancer Institute
- Thesis: Infection prophylaxis in chronic granulomatous disease: clinical efficacy of co-trimoxazole and recombinant human interferon gamma (1997)
- Doctoral advisor: Reinhard Seger
- Other academic advisors: Stuart Orkin
- Notable students: Raphael Morscher
- Website: https://www.kispi.uzh.ch/kinderspital/person/bourquin-md-phd-jean-pierre

Jean-Pierre Bourquin is a Swiss pediatric oncologist. He is a Professor of Pediatric Oncology at the University of Zurich and the Chief Physician (Chefarzt) of the Department of Hematology, Oncology, Immunology and Cellular Therapies at the University Children's Hospital Zurich. His research focuses on the oncogenic transcriptional, epigenetic and posttranscriptional mechanisms in childhood leukemia and translation in innovative therapies and precision precision medicine. Since 2026, he is the director of the Swiss National Competence Center for Research "Children & Cancer" funded by the SNFS.

== Career ==
In 1992, Bourquin obtained his Swiss Federal Diploma in Medicine and completed his MD thesis on "Infection prophylaxis in chronic granulomatous disease: clinical efficacy of co-trimoxazole and recombinant human interferon gamma" with Prof. Reinhard Seger at the University of Zurich. He subsequently enrolled in an M.D.-Ph.D. program, earning a doctorate in natural sciences (Dr. sc. nat.) at the University of Zurich in 1996 with a thesis on "Isolation of large serine/arginine-rich proteins that interact with the C-terminal domain (CTD) of the largest subunit of the RNA polymerase II" supervised by Walter Schaffner and Jeffry L. Corden.

Following his residency in pediatrics (1997–2000), he completed a fellowship in pediatric hematology/oncology at the Boston Children’s Hospital, Harvard Medical School from 2000 to 2004. During this time, he conducted postdoctoral research on molecular subtypes of acute megakaryoblastic leukemia in the laboratory of Stuart Orkin at the Dana-Farber Cancer Institute.

He received board certification in Pediatrics in 2002 and in Pediatric Hematology/Oncology in 2006. Bourquin completed his Habilitation at the University of Zurich in 2010.

At the University Children's Hospital Zurich, Bourquin served as a Senior Consultant Physician (Oberarzt) from 2004 to 2013 and as a Senior Physician (Leitender Arzt) from 2014 to 2020, where he built a program for hematologic malignancies. On February 1, 2020, he was appointed Head of Oncology (Chefarzt). Concurrently, he was appointed Extraordinary Professor of Pediatric Oncology at the University of Zurich in 2020, having previously served as an Adjunct Professor (Titularprofessor) since 2017.

Bourquin holds several leadership roles in international research consortia. Since 2019, he has chaired the Resistant Disease Committee of the International BFM Study Group (I-BFM). In 2020, he became the Chair of the Scientific Working Group on Precision Hematology of the European Hematology Association (EHA) and he was EHA board member from 2021-2025.

In 2026, he was appointed director along with Rafaele Renella (as co-director) of the National Centre of Competence in Research (NCCR) "Children & Cancer," a long-term funding instrument by the Swiss National Science Foundation (SNSF).

== Research ==
Bourquin's research focuses on the biology of very high-risk and drug-resistant leukemias. His laboratory investigates transcriptional dependencies in leukemia, such as the mechanisms driven by TCF3-HLF fusion proteins, and the role of the leukemia microenvironment in sustaining disease progression.

His group developed "Drug Response Profiling" (DRP), a functional precision medicine platform. This method involves the ex vivo screening of primary patient leukemia cells against libraries of therapeutic agents to identify individual drug sensitivities. The platform utilizes automated high-content microscopy to assess cell viability in co-cultures with mesenchymal stromal cells, aiming to replicate the bone marrow microenvironment. This approach has been incorporated into international clinical programs for refractory and drug-resistant leukemia. His research group established an international Federated Acute Leukemia Board and a DRP registry to harmonize clinical data and guide precision medicine strategies. These initiatives are supported by funding from Horizon Europe's IntReALL program. The DRP platform serves multiple clinical trials including the Platform-based trial HemiSmart.

Public reporting on his clinical work has included coverage of complex pediatric leukemia cases and the development of new therapies in Swiss national media. In a guest commentary in the Swiss daily newspaper NZZ, he elaborates on the importance of pediatric cancer research.

== Distinctions ==
- 2011: Walter and Gertrud Siegenthaler Research Award
- 2009: Kind-Philipp-Award (shared with Laura Bonapace and Beat Bornhauser) for research on overcoming glucocorticoid resistance in leukemia.

== Selected works ==
- Zeckanovic, Aida; Mouttet, Brice; Vinti, Luciana; Ancliff, Philip; Brethon, Benoît; Cario, Gunnar; Elitzur, Sarah; Hazar, Volkan; Kunz, Joachim; Möricke, Anja; Stein, Jerry; Yaman, Yöntem; Buechner, Jochen; Hjort, Magnus Aasved; O’Connor, David (2025-02-06). "Update on long-term outcomes of a cohort of patients with TCF3::HLF positive acute lymphoblastic leukemia treated with blinatumomab and stem cell transplantation". Haematologica. doi:10.3324/haematol.2024.286111. ISSN 1592-8721.
- Huang, Yun; Mouttet, Brice; Warnatz, Hans-Jörg; Risch, Thomas; Rietmann, Fabian; Frommelt, Fabian; Ngo, Quy A.; Dobay, Maria Pamela; Marovca, Blerim; Jenni, Silvia; Tsai, Yi-Chien; Matzk, Sören; Amstislavskiy, Vyacheslav; Schrappe, Martin; Stanulla, Martin (2019-12-01). "The Leukemogenic TCF3-HLF Complex Rewires Enhancers Driving Cellular Identity and Self-Renewal Conferring EP300 Vulnerability". Cancer Cell. 36 (6): 630–644.e9. doi:10.1016/j.ccell.2019.10.004.
- Fischer, Ute; Forster, Michael; Rinaldi, Anna; Risch, Thomas; Sungalee, Stéphanie; Warnatz, Hans-Jörg; Bornhauser, Beat; Gombert, Michael; Kratsch, Christina; Stütz, Adrian M; Sultan, Marc; Tchinda, Joelle; Worth, Catherine L; Amstislavskiy, Vyacheslav; Badarinarayan, Nandini (2015-09-01). "Genomics and drug profiling of fatal TCF3-HLF−positive acute lymphoblastic leukemia identifies recurrent mutation patterns and therapeutic options". Nature Genetics. 47 (9): 1020–1029. doi:10.1038/ng.3362. ISSN 1061-4036. PMC 4603357.
- Frismantas, V.; Bourquin, J.P.; et al. (2017). "Ex vivo drug response profiling detects recurrent sensitivity patterns in drug-resistant acute lymphoblastic leukemia". Blood. 129 (11): e26–e37. doi:10.1182/blood-2016-09-738070. hdl:10138/180169. PMC 5356455.
- Bonapace, L.; Bourquin, J.P.; et al. (2010). "Induction of autophagy-dependent necroptosis is required for childhood acute lymphoblastic leukemia cells to overcome glucocorticoid resistance". Journal of Clinical Investigation. 120 (4): 1310–1323. doi:10.1172/JCI39987. PMC 2846044.
