= Bosch–Boonstra–Schaaf optic atrophy syndrome =

- Other names: BBSOAS
- This condition is inherited via autosomal dominant manner.
- Causes: mutations in the NR2F1 gene

Bosch–Boonstra–Schaaf optic atrophy syndrome is a rare autosomally inherited condition characterised by developmental delay, intellectual disability and decreased visual acuity.

== Presentation ==
All patients described have suffered from developmental delay, intellectual disability (intelligence quotient range 48–74) and decreased visual acuity. Ocular abnormalities include small discs, pale discs, disc excavation, strabismus and latent nystagmus.

Other features of this condition are somewhat variable and include:

- Facial indicators
  - Protruding ears
  - Helical anomalies
  - Small nasal ridge
  - High nasal bridge
  - Upturned nose
  - Epicanthal folds
  - Upslanting palpebral fissures
- Skeletal indicators
  - Tapering fingers
  - Hypotonia

== Genetics ==
This condition is caused by mutations in the NR2F1 gene (formally named COUP-TF1). This gene is located on the long arm of chromosome 5 (5q15) and encodes a protein that acts as a nuclear receptor and transcriptional regulator. NR2F1 acts as a homo- or heterodimer and has two functionally conserved domains, a DNA building domain and a ligand binding domain. The syndrome is inherited in an autosomal dominant fashion. The variant spectrum is diverse and includes both missense variants and deletions.

== Genotype-phenotype correlation ==
The disease shows a clear genotype-phenotype correlation. Patients that have a loss of function variant (e.g. deletions) show a mild phenotype, while patients that carry a missense variant in the DNA binding domain show a severe neurological phenotype.

== Management ==
There is no curative treatment known at present for his condition. Management is supportive.

== Epidemiology ==
This condition is considered rare, with an estimated prevalence between 1 in 100,000 to 250,000 people worldwide. So far BBSOAS has been diagnosed in more than 100 patients.

== History ==
This condition was first described in 2014.
