= IST1 homolog =

Protein-coding gene in the species Homo sapiens

IST1
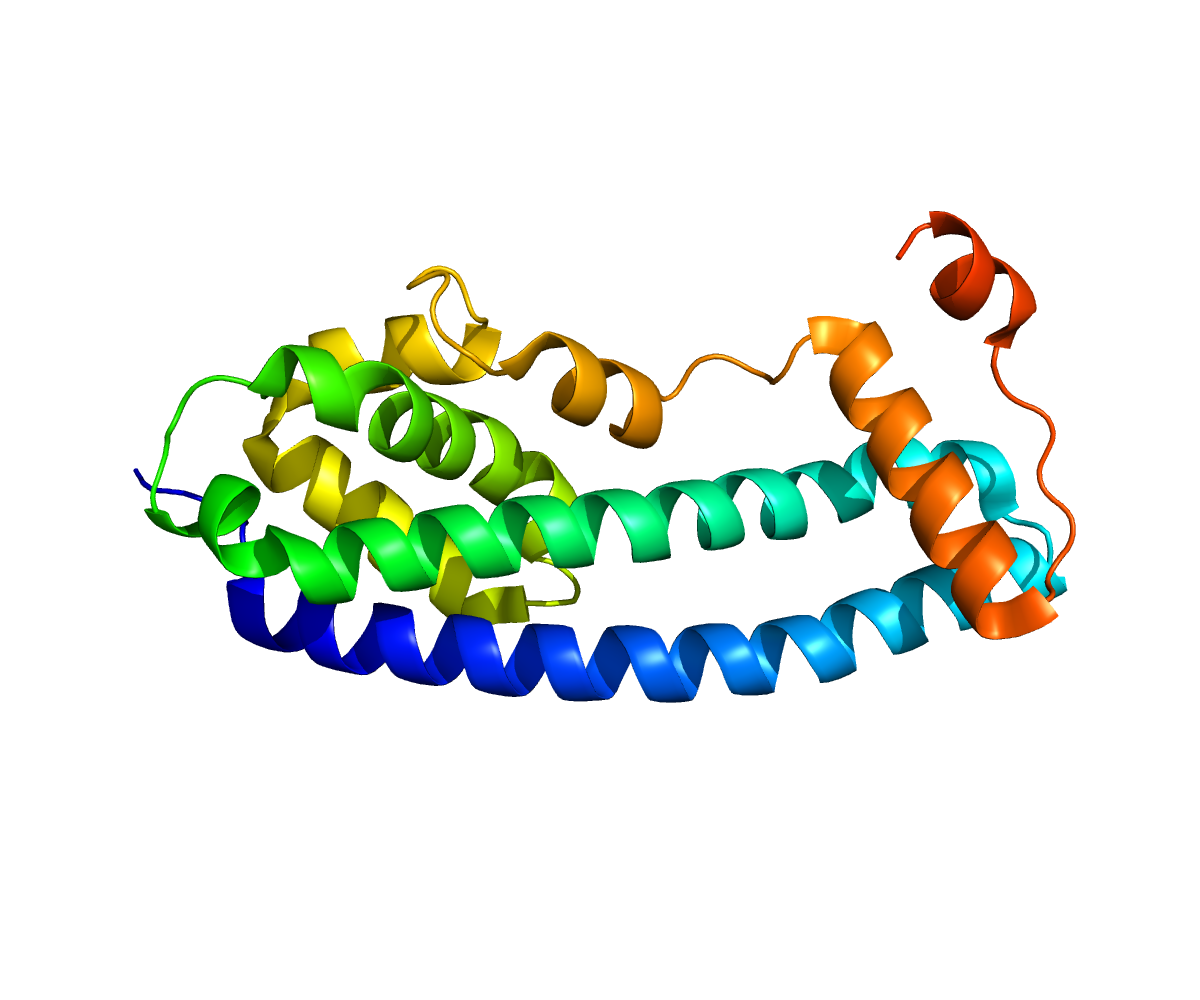

Identifiers
- Aliases: IST1, OLC1, KIAA0174, ESCRT-III associated factor, CHMP8, IST1 factor associated with ESCRT-III
- External IDs: OMIM: 616434; MGI: 1919205; GeneCards: IST1
Available structures
PDB	Ortholog search: PDBe RCSB
PDB	List of PDB id codes 3FRR, 3FRS, 4U7E, 4U7I, 4U7Y, 4WZX, 3JC1

Gene location (Human)
Chr.	Chromosome 16 (human)
Band	16q22.2	Start	71,845,996 bp
Band	16q22.2	End	71,931,199 bp

Gene location (Mouse)
Chr.	Chromosome 8 (mouse)
Band	8|8 D3	Start	110,397,957 bp
Band	8|8 D3	End	110,419,892 bp
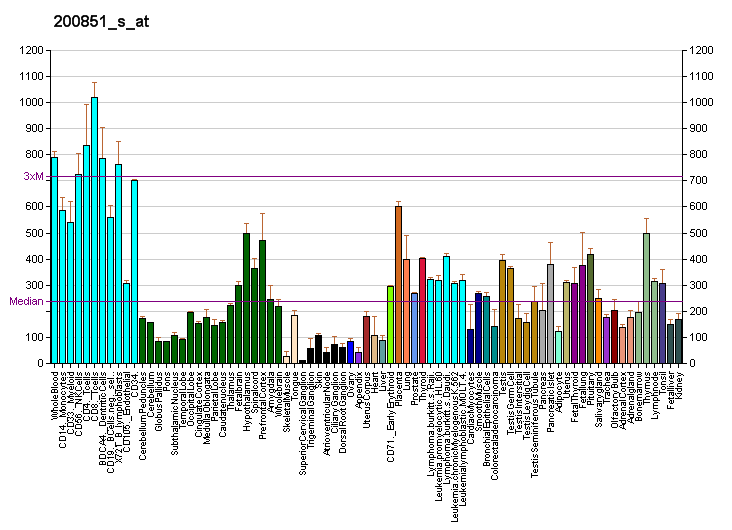
RNA expression pattern
Bgee	Human / Mouse (ortholog); Top expressed in: left ovary; gastric mucosa; rectum; right ovary; right uterine tube; skin of leg; body of uterus; skin of abdomen; canal of the cervix; anterior pituitary / Top expressed in: transitional epithelium of urinary bladder; medullary collecting duct; vestibular sensory epithelium; stroma of bone marrow; superior cervical ganglion; hair follicle; renal corpuscle; pyloric antrum; gastric mucosa; dermis; More reference expression data
BioGPS	More reference expression data
Gene ontology
Molecular function	protein domain specific binding; protein-containing complex binding; protein binding; MIT domain binding; cadherin binding
Cellular component	cytoplasm; cytosol; centrosome; Flemming body; microtubule organizing center; extracellular exosome; cytoskeleton; cytoplasmic vesicle; endoplasmic reticulum-Golgi intermediate compartment; midbody; nuclear envelope; nucleus; extracellular region; azurophil granule lumen; intracellular membrane-bounded organelle; chromatin
Biological process	protein localization; viral release from host cell; abscission; establishment of protein localization; viral capsid secondary envelopment; multivesicular body assembly; cytokinesis; positive regulation of collateral sprouting; cell division; positive regulation of proteolysis; protein transport; cell cycle; ESCRT III complex disassembly; neutrophil degranulation; cytoskeleton-dependent cytokinesis
Sources:Amigo / QuickGO
Orthologs
Databases	NCBI: entry; OMA: entry
Species	Human	Mouse
Entrez	9798	71955
Ensembl	ENSG00000182149	ENSMUSG00000031729
UniProt	P53990	Q9CX00
RefSeq (mRNA)	NM_014761; NM_001270975; NM_001270976; NM_001270977; NM_001270978 NM_001270979	NM_028018; NM_001361562
RefSeq (protein)	NP_001257904; NP_001257905; NP_001257906; NP_001257907; NP_001257908 NP_055576	NP_082294; NP_001348491
Location (UCSC)	Chr 16: 71.85 – 71.93 Mb	Chr 8: 110.4 – 110.42 Mb
PubMed search
- Wikidata
View/Edit Human	View/Edit Mouse

IST1 homolog is a protein that in humans is encoded by the IST1 gene (previously KIAA0174). IST1 homolog interacts with the ESCRT (endosomal sorting complexes required for transport), which is involved with vesicle budding and cytokinesis.
