= CDCA7L =

Protein-coding gene in the species Homo sapiens

Identifiers
- Aliases: CDCA7L, JPO2, R1, RAM2, cell division cycle associated 7 like
- External IDs: OMIM: 609685; MGI: 2384982; HomoloGene: 10285; GeneCards: CDCA7L; OMA:CDCA7L - orthologs

Gene location (Human)
Chr.	Chromosome 7 (human)
Band	7p15.3	Start	21,900,899 bp
Band	7p15.3	End	21,945,903 bp

Gene location (Mouse)
Chr.	Chromosome 12 (mouse)
Band	12|12 F2	Start	117,768,024 bp
Band	12|12 F2	End	117,842,441 bp
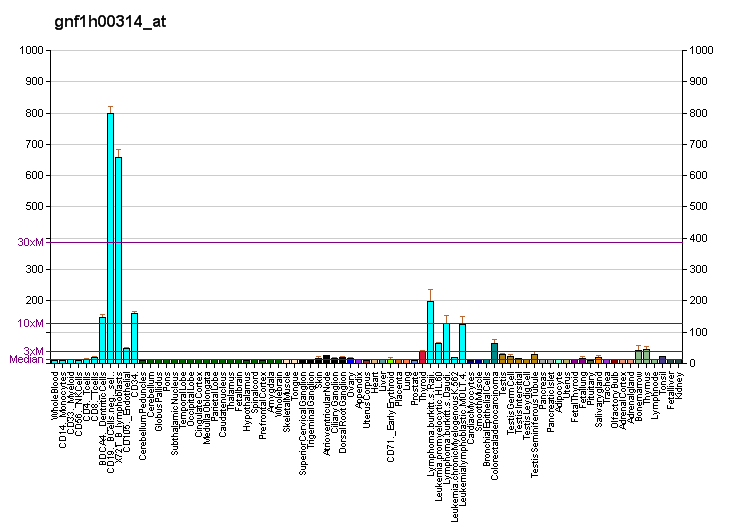
RNA expression pattern
Bgee	Human / Mouse (ortholog); Top expressed in: germinal epithelium; gonad; ventricular zone; pancreatic ductal cell; cardiac muscle tissue of right atrium; right uterine tube; bone marrow; ganglionic eminence; palpebral conjunctiva; testicle / Top expressed in: Bowman's capsule; primitive streak; tail of embryo; epiblast; genital tubercle; zygote; secondary oocyte; otic vesicle; medullary collecting duct; embryo; More reference expression data
BioGPS	More reference expression data
Gene ontology
Molecular function	protein binding
Cellular component	nucleolus; nucleus; fibrillar center; cytoplasm; cytosol
Biological process	regulation of transcription, DNA-templated; transcription, DNA-templated; positive regulation of cell population proliferation
Sources:Amigo / QuickGO
Orthologs
Species	Human	Mouse
Entrez	55536	217946
Ensembl	ENSG00000164649	ENSMUSG00000021175
UniProt	Q96GN5	Q922M5
RefSeq (mRNA)	NM_018719; NM_001127370; NM_001127371	NM_146040
RefSeq (protein)	NP_001120842; NP_001120843; NP_061189	NP_666152
Location (UCSC)	Chr 7: 21.9 – 21.95 Mb	Chr 12: 117.77 – 117.84 Mb
PubMed search
- Wikidata
View/Edit Human	View/Edit Mouse

Cell division cycle-associated 7-like protein is a protein that in humans is encoded by the CDCA7L gene.
