= PIM2 (gene) =

Protein-coding gene in the species Homo sapiens

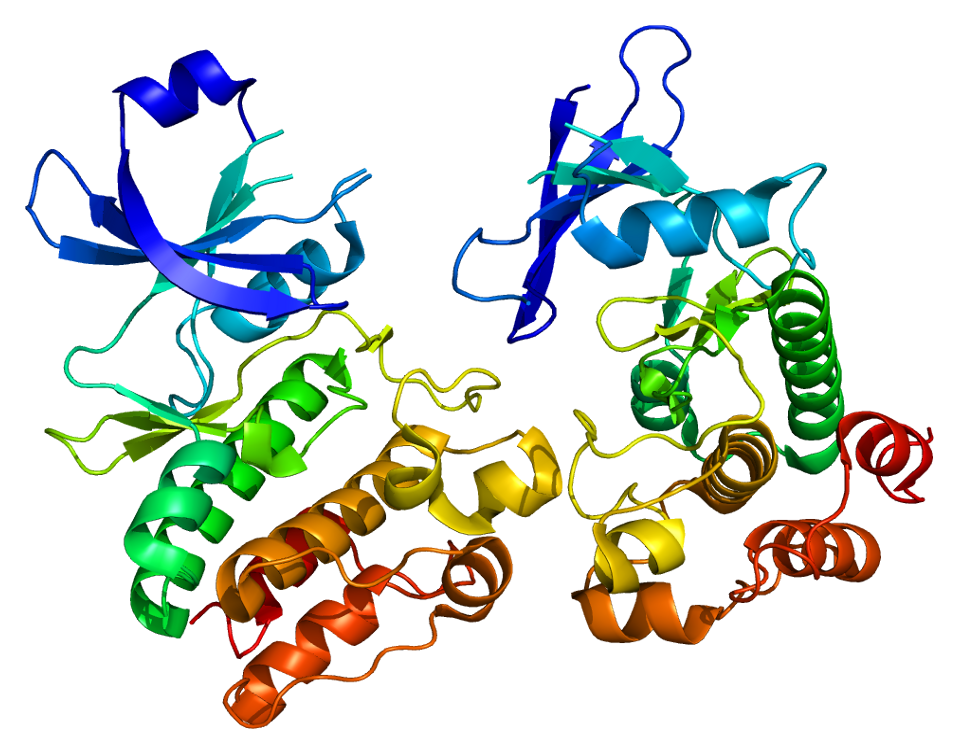

Identifiers
- Aliases: PIM2, Pim-2 proto-oncogene, serine/threonine kinase
- External IDs: OMIM: 300295; MGI: 97587; GeneCards: PIM2
Available structures
PDB	Ortholog search: PDBe RCSB
PDB	List of PDB id codes 2IWI, 4X7Q
Enzyme activity
EC #	BRENDA	ExPASy	KEGG	MetaCyc
2.7.11.1	↗	↗	↗	↗

Gene location (Human)
Chr.	X chromosome (human)
Band	Xp11.23	Start	48,913,182 bp
Band	Xp11.23	End	48,919,024 bp

Gene location (Mouse)
Chr.	X chromosome (mouse)
Band	X A1.1|X 3.55 cM	Start	7,744,501 bp
Band	X A1.1|X 3.55 cM	End	7,749,671 bp
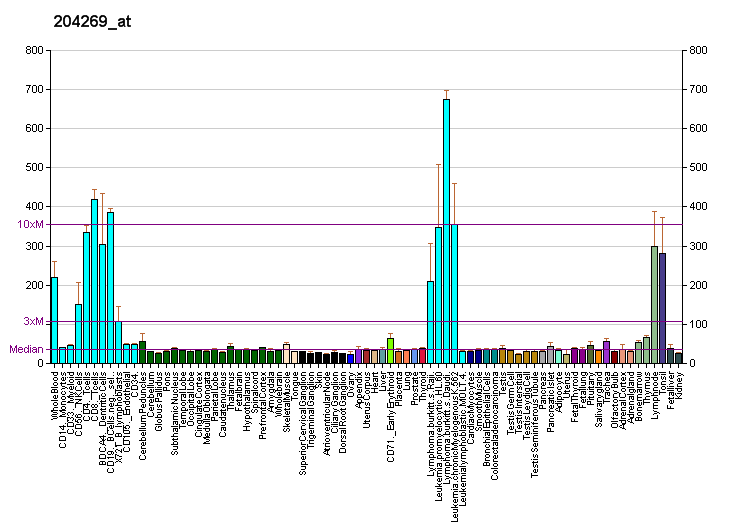
RNA expression pattern
Bgee	Human / Mouse (ortholog); Top expressed in: granulocyte; spleen; rectum; appendix; lymph node; blood; epithelium of colon; bone marrow cell; mucosa of transverse colon; minor salivary glands / Top expressed in: epiblast; embryo; bone marrow; hypothalamus; spleen; striatum of neuraxis; islet of Langerhans; primary visual cortex; hippocampus proper; Cortex of frontal lobe; More reference expression data
BioGPS	More reference expression data
Gene ontology
Molecular function	transferase activity; nucleotide binding; protein kinase activity; kinase activity; protein serine/threonine kinase activity; protein binding; ATP binding
Cellular component	cytoplasm
Biological process	phosphorylation; male meiotic nuclear division; response to virus; negative regulation of apoptotic process; protein phosphorylation; regulation of mitotic cell cycle; protein autophosphorylation; cell cycle; cell population proliferation; negative regulation of cell population proliferation; apoptotic process; apoptotic mitochondrial changes; positive regulation of autophagy; positive regulation of macroautophagy; negative regulation of protein binding; positive regulation of I-kappaB kinase/NF-kappaB signaling; positive regulation of transcription, DNA-templated; protein stabilization; G1/S transition of mitotic cell cycle
Sources:Amigo / QuickGO
Orthologs
Databases	NCBI: entry; OMA: entry
Species	Human	Mouse
Entrez	11040	18715
Ensembl	ENSG00000102096	ENSMUSG00000031155
UniProt	Q9P1W9	Q62070
RefSeq (mRNA)	NM_006875	NM_138606
RefSeq (protein)	NP_006866	NP_613072
Location (UCSC)	Chr X: 48.91 – 48.92 Mb	Chr X: 7.74 – 7.75 Mb
PubMed search
- Wikidata
View/Edit Human	View/Edit Mouse

Serine/threonine-protein kinase Pim-2 is an enzyme that in humans is encoded by the PIM2 (Proviral Integrations of Moloney virus 2) gene. The enzyme is a serine/threonine kinase that has roles in cell growth, proliferation, apoptosis, and regulation of signal transduction cascades.

== Structure ==
Thus far, most of the structural information pertaining to the PIM kinase family has been limited to PIM1. As a result, most of inhibitor development efforts has also been towards PIM1. PIM2 shares 55% sequence identity with PIM1, and the structure of PIM2 is quite closely related to PIM1. Like PIM1, PIM2 shows a bi-lobal kinase architecture with a constitutively active closed conformation. The main chain of both molecules is identical with the exception of two flexible regions in the N-terminal lobe.

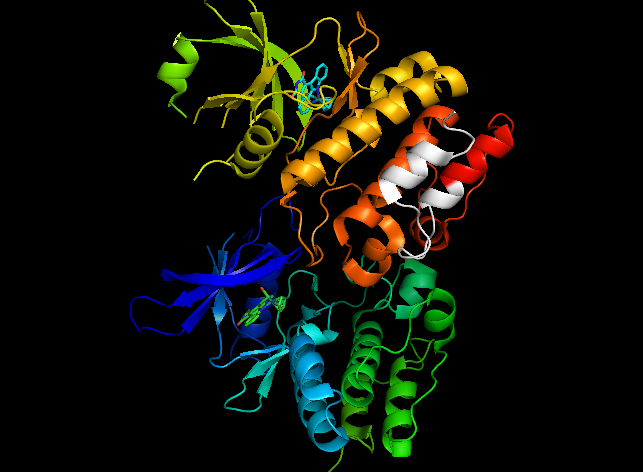
PIM2: Last 23 Residues in white

The most significant structural difference between PIM1 and PIM2 is the absence of the terminal αJ helix in PIM2. The last 23 residues of PIM2 are quite different from PIM1, as PIM2 contains 6 proline residues in this region and is not believed to form the same tertiary structures. As a result, the absence of the interactions present in this region may increase flexibility in PIM2 within the N-terminal kinase lobe and contribute to the disordered regions of the PIM2 structure.

== Function ==
PIM2 is expressed with high levels in the brain and lymphoid cells. PIM1-3 compound knockout mice that survived the perinatal period showed a large reduction in body size. This suggests that the PIM enzymes are important for body growth. Experiments have implicated that PIM1 and PIM2 are necessary for cytokine-dependent proliferation and survival of lymphocytes. Experiments with transgenic mice with induced lymphomas revealed elevated levels of PIM2 as a frequent but late event in tumorigenesis.

Experiments done on nuclear factor κB (NFκB) nuclear translocation in human perineural invasion (PNI) revealed that an up-regulation of NFκB and its downstream target, PIM2, were components of an antiapoptosis signaling cascade, which is associated with cancer cells in PNI. This cascade may regulate the inhibition of apoptosis. The study also showed that elevated levels of PIM2 have been associated with PNI. The PIM2 kinase has therefore emerged as a key drug target to restore apoptosis in drug resistant human cancers.

== Mechanism ==
In reported crystal structures, PIM1 and PIM2 assume an active conformation. Typically, kinases' active state is characterized by the presence of the conserved lysine, a closed lobe conformation, and a well-structured activation segment. The activation segment often necessitates phosphorylation in order for there to be catalytic activity. Once phosphorylated, the active segment folds onto the lower lobe and reorganizes the peptide-binding site, which consequently leads to enzymatic activation. However, PIM kinases are catalytically active without phosphorylation. The crystal structures show that the unphosphorylated activation segment forms many polar interactions with the lower kinase lobe, which stabilizes the active conformation. While PIM kinase do autophosphorylate, the functional consequences are not known.

== Inhibitors ==
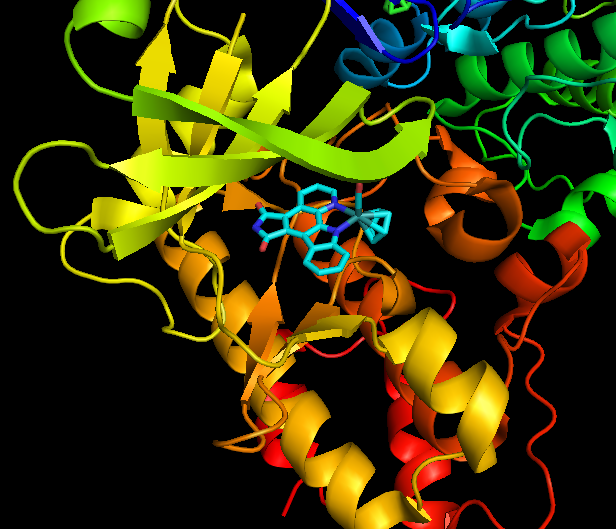
Inhibitor acts as ATP mimetic in ATP binding pocket

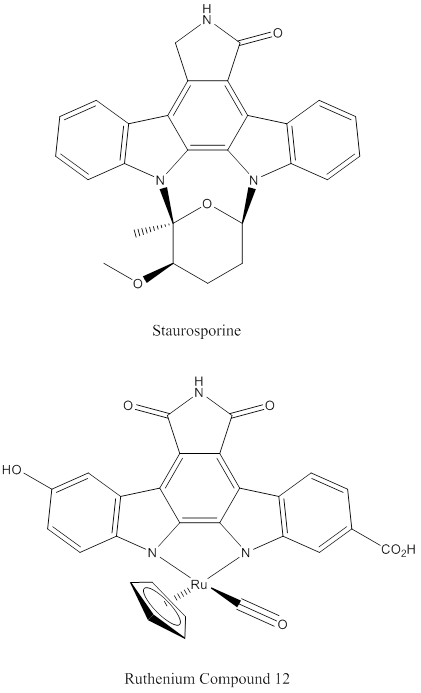
Staurosporine and Ruthenium Compound 12

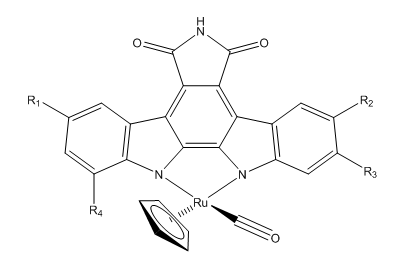
General Structure of Organoruthenium inhibitor

PIM2 (along with PIM1) has a unique binding pocket for ATP with a hinged region, making it an attractive target for potent small-molecule PIM kinase inhibitors.

Many inhibitors are often more selective for PIM1 and PIM3 over PIM2. In other words, PIM2 is usually inhibited with much lower potency. Thus far, structural models are unable to explain this phenomenon. However, it could be related to the differences in the dynamic properties of the different PIM isoforms.

In a series of organoruthenium compounds based on a Staurosporine scaffold compound 12 gave almost complete inhibition at a concentration of 10 nM. However, it was marginally less effective against PIM1.

The SAR suggests that the addition of potential hydrogen bonding groups at the R1 and R2 positions dramatically increases potency against both kinases. Similar substitution of the R3 position was less effective and halogen substitution was even more disruptive.

== Clinical significance ==
In a study with 48 patients who had non-Hodgkin's lymphoma (NHL) and lymphocytic leukemia, hPim-2 expression was analyzed using in-situ hybridization, quantitative RT-PCR and FACS analysis. The studies showed higher levels of expression in NHL over normal lymphocytes as well as in chronic lymphocytic leukemia over normal B-Cells.

Elevated PIM2 levels have also been found in primary blasts from acute myeloid leukemia patients. PIM2 may be an important kinase in the phosphorylation of 4E-BP1. Constitutive phosphorylation of 4E-BP1 is commonly found in cancers and contributes to the sustained translation of malignancy related transcripts, among which are c-Myc and Cyclin D. Knockdown of PIM2 by iRNA strongly reduced the accumulation of oncogenic proteins. As a result, PIM2 may be an attractive target for acute myeloid leukemia.
