= BCL11A =

Protein-coding gene in humans

Identifiers
- Aliases: BCL11A, BCL11A-L, BCL11A-S, BCL11A-XL, BCL11a-M, CTIP1, EVI9, HBFQTL5, ZNF856, B-cell CLL/lymphoma 11A, DILOS, B cell CLL/lymphoma 11A, BAF complex component, BAF chromatin remodeling complex subunit SMARCM1
- External IDs: OMIM: 606557; MGI: 106190; GeneCards: BCL11A

Gene location (Human)
Chr.	Chromosome 2 (human)
Band	2p16.1	Start	60,450,520 bp
Band	2p16.1	End	60,554,467 bp

Gene location (Mouse)
Chr.	Chromosome 11 (mouse)
Band	11|11 A3.2	Start	24,078,056 bp
Band	11|11 A3.2	End	24,174,123 bp
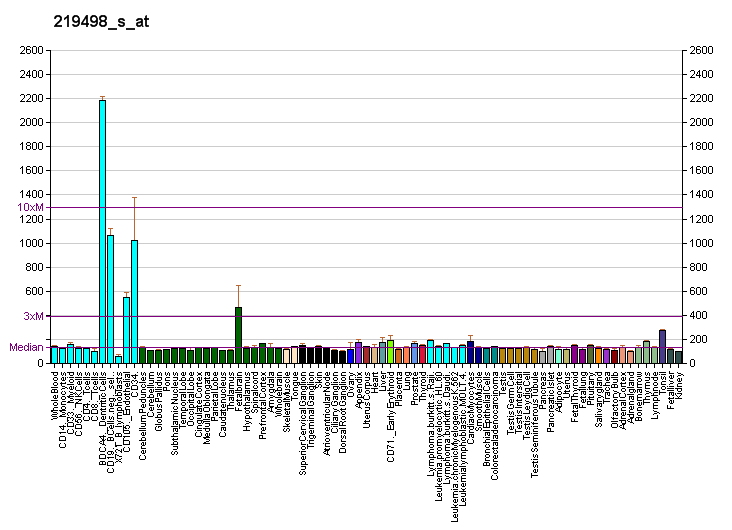

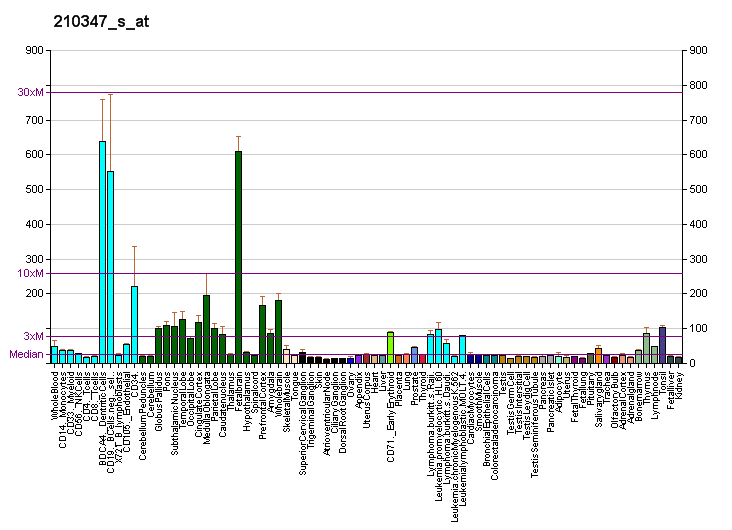

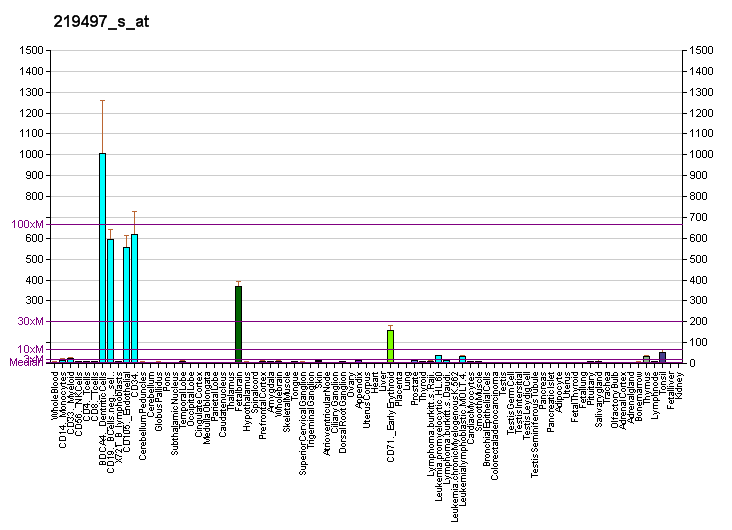
RNA expression pattern
Bgee	Human / Mouse (ortholog); Top expressed in: ganglionic eminence; primary visual cortex; Brodmann area 23; skin of hip; skin of thigh; middle temporal gyrus; postcentral gyrus; Region I of hippocampus proper; ventricular zone; superior frontal gyrus / Top expressed in: Rostral migratory stream; barrel cortex; ganglionic eminence; piriform cortex; primary motor cortex; subiculum; medial ganglionic eminence; olfactory tubercle; subdivision of hippocampus; Region I of hippocampus proper; More reference expression data
BioGPS	More reference expression data
Gene ontology
Molecular function	protein homodimerization activity; metal ion binding; RNA polymerase II cis-regulatory region sequence-specific DNA binding; DNA-binding transcription repressor activity, RNA polymerase II-specific; protein binding; protein heterodimerization activity; nucleic acid binding; DNA-binding transcription factor activity, RNA polymerase II-specific; DNA-binding transcription factor activity; protein kinase binding; sequence-specific DNA binding
Cellular component	cytoplasm; nucleoplasm; nucleus; postsynaptic density
Biological process	negative regulation of protein homooligomerization; negative regulation of neuron projection development; regulation of transcription, DNA-templated; regulation of dendrite development; negative regulation of transcription by RNA polymerase II; positive regulation of collateral sprouting; protein sumoylation; transcription, DNA-templated; negative regulation of collateral sprouting; positive regulation of neuron projection development; negative regulation of axon extension; signal transduction; positive regulation of transcription by RNA polymerase II; neurogenesis; negative regulation of dendrite development; positive regulation of gene expression; negative regulation of dendrite extension; negative regulation of neuron remodeling; cellular response to L-glutamate; negative regulation of branching morphogenesis of a nerve
Sources:Amigo / QuickGO
Orthologs
Databases	NCBI: entry; OMA: entry
Species	Human	Mouse
Entrez	53335	14025
Ensembl	ENSG00000119866	ENSMUSG00000000861
UniProt	Q9H165	Q9QYE3
RefSeq (mRNA)	NM_018014; NM_022893; NM_138553; NM_138559; NM_001363864 NM_001365609	NM_001159289; NM_001159290; NM_001242934; NM_016707
RefSeq (protein)	NP_060484; NP_075044; NP_612569; NP_001350793; NP_001352538	NP_001152761; NP_001152762; NP_001229863; NP_057916
Location (UCSC)	Chr 2: 60.45 – 60.55 Mb	Chr 11: 24.08 – 24.17 Mb
PubMed search
- Wikidata
View/Edit Human	View/Edit Mouse

B-cell lymphoma/leukemia 11A is a protein that in humans is encoded by the BCL11A gene.

== Function ==
The BCL11A gene encodes for a regulatory C2H2 type zinc-finger protein, that can bind to the DNA. Five alternatively spliced transcript variants of this gene, which encode distinct isoforms, have been reported. The protein associates with the SWI/SNF complex, that regulates gene expression via chromatin remodeling.

BCL11A is highly expressed in several hematopoietic lineages, and plays a role in the switch from γ- to β-globin expression during the fetal to adult erythropoiesis transition.

Furthermore, BCL11A is expressed in the brain, where it forms a protein complex with CASK to regulate axon outgrowth and branching. In the neocortex, BCL11A binds to the TBR1 regulatory region and inhibits the expression of TBR1.

Tetramerization of BCL11A shields it from proteasomal degradation and is critical for its γ-globin repression activity.

== Clinical significance ==
The corresponding Bcl11a mouse gene is a common site of retroviral integration in myeloid leukemia, and may function as a leukemia disease gene, in part, through its interaction with BCL6. During hematopoietic cell differentiation, this gene is down-regulated. It is possibly involved in lymphoma pathogenesis since translocations associated with B-cell malignancies also deregulates its expression. In addition, BCL11A has been found to play a role in the suppression of fetal hemoglobin production. Therapeutic strategies aimed at increasing fetal hemoglobin production in diseases such as beta thalassemia and sickle cell anemia by inhibiting BCL11A are currently being explored.

Furthermore, heterozygous de novo mutations in BCL11A have been identified in an intellectual disability disorder, accompanied with global developmental delay and autism spectrum disorder. These mutations disrupt BCL11A homodimerization and transcriptional regulation.

BCL11A has also been identified as an important gene of interest in type-2 diabetes. Methylation of BCL11A has been hypothesized to contribute to type-2 diabetes risk, while BCL11a loss in a human islet model was demonstrated to result in an increase in insulin secretion.

== Interactions ==
BCL11A has been shown to interact with a number of proteins. BCL11A was initially discovered as a COUP-TFI interacting protein. In the nucleus, BCL11A forms paraspeckles that co-localize with NONO. In neurons, BCL11A interacts with CASK to regulate target genes. Furthermore, BCL11A interacts with the neuron-specific protein TBR1, which is also implicated in intellectual disability and autism spectrum disorder.
