= Genetic causes of type 2 diabetes =

Most cases of type 2 diabetes involved many genes contributing small amount to the overall condition. As of 2011 more than 36 genes have been found that contribute to the risk of type 2 diabetes. All of these genes together still only account for 10% of the total genetic component of the disease.

There are a number of rare cases of diabetes that arise due to an abnormality in a single gene (known as monogenic forms of diabetes). These include maturity onset diabetes of the young (MODY), Donohue syndrome, and Rabson–Mendenhall syndrome, among others. Maturity onset diabetes of the young constitute 1–5% of all cases of diabetes in young people.

== Polygenic ==
Genetic cause and mechanism of type 2 diabetes is largely unknown. However, single nucleotide polymorphism (SNP) is one of many mechanisms that leads to increased risk for type 2 diabetes. To locate genes and loci that are responsible for the risk of type 2 diabetes, genome wide association studies (GWAS) was utilized to compare the genomes of diabetic patient group and the non-diabetic control group. The diabetic patients' genome sequences differ from the controls' genome in specific loci along and around numerous genes, and these differences in the nucleotide sequences alter phenotypic traits that exhibit increased susceptibility to the diabetes. GWAS has revealed 65 different loci (where single nucleotide sequences differ from the patient and control group's genomes), and genes associated with type 2 diabetes, including TCF7L2, PPARG, FTO, KCNJ11, NOTCH2, WFS1, IGF2BP2, SLC30A8, JAZF1, HHEX, DGKB, CDKN2A, CDKN2B, KCNQ1, HNF1A, HNF1B MC4R, GIPR, HNF4A, MTNR1B, PPARG, ZBED3, SLC30A8, CDKAL1, GLIS3, GCK, GCKR, among others.KCNJ11 (potassium inwardly rectifying channel, subfamily J, member 11), encodes the islet ATP-sensitive potassium channel Kir6.2, and TCF7L2 (transcription factor 7–like 2) regulates proglucagon gene expression and thus the production of glucagon-like peptide-1. In addition, there is also a mutation to the Islet Amyloid Polypeptide gene that results in an earlier onset, more severe, form of diabetes. However, this is not a comprehensive list of genes that affects the proneness to the diabetes.

SNP rs7873784 located in the 3′-untranslated region (3′-UTR) of TLR4 gene and associated with the development of type-2 diabetes mellitus. PU.1 binding to the minor C allele of rs7873784 may be responsible for elevated TLR4 expression in the monocytes of affected individuals, contributing to an inflammation-prone environment that predisposes minor allele carriers to development of certain pathologies with an inflammatory component. rs7873784 was also associated with the abnormal metabolic phenotype accompanying T2DM (levels of fasting insulin and triglycerides, abnormal low-density lipoprotein and high-density lipoprotein cholesterol levels). However, there is growing evidence that T2DM is not only a purely metabolic, but also an inflammatory disorder. The link between certain TLR4 SNPs alleles and T2DM may be directly related to elevated TLR4 expression since its signaling can regulate diet-induced obesity and insulin resistance and, therefore, influence the pathogenesis of T2DM. TLR4 expression is elevated in adipose tissue of obese mice and its activation triggered insulin resistance in adipocytes. LPS-mediated TLR4 activation can suppress glucose-induced insulin secretion by β-cells. Monocytes from T2DM patients demonstrate increased TLR4 expression, NFκB activity, and production of proinflammatory cytokines and chemokines. A number of endogenous TLR4 ligands are elevated in patients with diabetes. Oxidized LDL upregulates TLR4 expression in macrophages and provokes TLR4-dependent inflammation in the arterial wall, further TLR4 activation results in a strong inhibition of cholesterol efflux from macrophages. The hepatic secretory glycoprotein fetuin-A correlates with increased risk of developing T2DM and may promote lipid-induced insulin resistance via TLR4 activation, resulting in production of proinflammatory cytokines. Additionally, mice with deficiencies in TLR4 signaling were protected from insulin resistance caused by high-fat diet and from secondary complications of T2DM such as atherosclerosis.

Most SNPs that increase the risk of diabetes reside in noncoding regions of the genes, making the SNP's mechanism for increasing susceptibility largely unknown. However, they are thought to influence the susceptibility by altering the regulation of those gene expressions. Only few genes (PARG6, KCNJ11-ABCC8, SLC30A8, and GCKR) have SNPs in the open reading frame (ORF). These SNPs in ORFs result in altering of the protein function, and the altered function and therefore compromise the performances of the protein product causes increased susceptibility to the type 2 diabetes.

One of the examples of gene regulation in non-ORF SNPs that influences susceptibility is the changes in nucleotide sequence in microRNA (miRNA) binding site. miRNAs regulate gene expression by binding to the target mRNAs and physically block translation. SNPs on the miRNA-binding site can result in faulty levels of gene expression as miRNA fails to bind to the corresponding mRNA effectively, leading to excess amount of protein product overall. Although the protein structure of the genes with SNPs are identical to that of the normal gene product, due to their faulty level of expressions, those genes increase risk. Genes such as CDKN2A, CDKN2B, and HNF1B exhibit increase the risk phenotype with SNPs in their 3' UTR miRNA binding sites. As CDKN2A and B regulate the pancreatic beta-cell replication, and HNF1B is homeodomain containing transcription factor that regulates other genes, faulty regulations of those genes increase the risk of diabetes.

Another example of faulty gene regulation that influence the susceptibility is the SNPs in promoter regions of the genes. Gene like APOM and APM1 increase the risk of type 2 diabetes when there are SNPs in their proximal promoter regions. Promoters are sequences of DNA that allows proteins such as transcription factors to bind for gene expression, and when the sequences are modified, the proteins no longer bind as effectively, resulting in depressed level of gene expression. APOM is partly responsible for producing pre beta-high-density lipoprotein and cholesterol, and APM1 is responsible for regulating glucose level in blood and fatty acid. Decreasing the level these gene products reduce the body's ability to handle glucose, which leads to the increased risk of diabetes.

Since 2019 large sequencing studies have started to identify rare coding variants associated with type 2 diabetes risk, including variants in PAM and SLC30A8. Population-based sequencing studies have since identified numerous other genes harbouring rare large-effect variants for type 2 diabetes, including the known MODY gene GCK (over 14-fold increased odds) and the gene GIGYF1 (4-6 fold increased odds).

Those discovered genes do not determine susceptibility to diabetes for all people or cases. As the risk of diabetes is combination of the gene regulations and the interplay between those gene products, certain genes may not pose a threat to increase the susceptibility. TCF7L2 is one of the well-studied genes for diabetes susceptibility in most populations. However, SNPs in TCF7L2 that would normally increase the risk of diabetes does not affect the susceptibility for Pima Indians. However, this gene is associated with regulating the BMI for Pima Indian population.

Various hereditary conditions may feature diabetes, for example myotonic dystrophy and Friedreich's ataxia. Wolfram's syndrome is an autosomal recessive neurodegenerative disorder that first becomes evident in childhood. It consists of diabetes insipidus, diabetes mellitus, optic atrophy, and deafness, hence the acronym DIDMOAD.

While obesity is an independent risk factor for type 2 diabetes that may be linked to lifestyle, obesity is also a trait that may be strongly inherited. Other research also shows that type 2 diabetes can cause obesity as an effect of the changes in metabolism and other deranged cell behavior attendant on insulin resistance.

However, environmental factors (almost certainly diet and weight) play a large part in the development of type 2 diabetes in addition to any genetic component. Genetic risk for type 2 diabetes changes as humans first began migrating around the world, implying a strong environmental component has affected the genetic-basis of type 2 diabetes. This can be seen from the adoption of the type 2 diabetes epidemiological pattern in those who have moved to a different environment as compared to the same genetic pool who have not. Immigrants to Western developed countries, for instance, may be more prone to diabetes as compared to its lower incidence in their countries of origins. Such developments can also be found in environments which have had a recent increase in social wealth, increasingly common throughout Asia.

== See also ==
- Epigenetics of diabetes Type 2
- Maturity-onset diabetes of the young
- Genetics of obesity
