= Thrifty gene hypothesis =

Evolutionary biology hypothesis

The thrifty gene hypothesis is an attempt by geneticist James V. Neel to explain why certain populations and subpopulations in the modern day are prone to diabetes mellitus type 2. He proposed the hypothesis in 1962 to resolve a problem: diabetes is a harmful medical condition, yet it is also common, and has a strong genetic basis. The problem is to understand how disease with a likely genetic component and with such negative effects may have been favoured by the process of natural selection. Neel suggested the resolution to this problem is that genes which predispose to diabetes (called 'thrifty genes') were historically advantageous, but they became detrimental in the modern world. In his words they were "rendered detrimental by 'progress'". Neel's primary interest was in diabetes, but the idea was soon expanded to encompass obesity as well. Thrifty genes are genes which enable individuals to efficiently collect and process food to deposit fat during periods of food abundance in order to provide for periods of food shortage (feast and famine).

According to the hypothesis, the 'thrifty' genotype would have been advantageous for hunter-gatherer populations, especially child-bearing women, because it would allow them to fatten more quickly during times of abundance. Fatter individuals carrying the thrifty genes would thus better survive times of food scarcity. However, in modern societies with a constant abundance of food, this genotype effectively prepares individuals for a famine that never comes. The result of this mismatch between the environment in which the brain evolved and the environment of today is widespread chronic obesity and related health problems like diabetes.

The hypothesis has received various criticisms and several modified or alternative hypotheses have been proposed.

== Hypothesis and research by Neel ==
James Neel, a professor of Human Genetics at the University of Michigan Medical School, proposed the "thrifty genotype" hypothesis in 1962 in his paper "Diabetes Mellitus: A 'Thrifty' Genotype Rendered Detrimental by 'Progress'?" Neel intended the paper to provoke further contemplation and research on the possible evolutionary and genetic causes of diabetes among populations that had only recently come into regular contact with Westerners.

The genetic paradox Neel sought to address was this: diabetes conferred a significant reproductive (and thus evolutionary) disadvantage to anyone who had it; yet the populations Neel studied had diabetes in such high frequencies that a genetic predisposition to develop diabetes seemed plausible. Neel sought to unravel the mystery of why genes that promote diabetes had not been naturally-selected out of the population's gene pool.

Neel proposed that a genetic predisposition to develop diabetes was adaptive to the feast and famine cycles of Paleolithic human existence, allowing humans to fatten rapidly and profoundly during times of feast in order that they might better survive during times of famine. This would have been advantageous then but not in the current environment.

The hypothesis was proposed before there was a clear distinction between the different types of diabetes. Neel later stated that the hypothesis applied to non-insulin-dependent diabetes mellitus. In its original form the theory more specifically stated that diabetes may be due to a rapid insulin response which would prevent loss of glucose from the urine. Furthermore, it made use of a then popular theory which was later disproven. This argued that specific insulin antagonists were released in response to insulin with this causing diabetes.

In the decades following the publications of his first paper on the "thrifty genotype" hypothesis, Neel researched the frequency of diabetes and (increasingly) obesity in a number of other populations and sought out observations that might disprove or discount his "thrifty gene" hypothesis.

Neel's further investigations cast doubt on the "thrifty genotype" hypothesis. If a propensity to develop diabetes were an evolutionary adaptation, then diabetes would have been a disease of long standing in those populations currently experiencing a high frequency of diabetes. However, Neel found no evidence of diabetes among these populations earlier in the century. And when he tested younger members of these populations for glucose intolerance - which might have indicated a predisposition for diabetes - he found none.

In 1989, Neel published a review of his further research based on the "thrifty genotype" hypothesis and in the Introduction noted the following: "The data on which that (rather soft) hypothesis was based has now largely collapsed." However, Neel argued that "...the concept of a "thrifty genotype" remains as viable as when first advanced...". He went on to advance that the thrifty genotype concept be thought of in the context of a "compromised" genotype that affects several other metabolically related diseases.

Neel in a 1998 review described an expanded form of the original hypothesis, diabetes being caused by "thrifty genes" adapted specifically for intermittent starvation, to a more complex theory of several related diseases such as diabetes, obesity, and hypertension (see also metabolic syndrome) being caused by physiological systems adapted for an older environment being pushed beyond their limits by environmental changes. Thus, one possible remedy for these diseases is changing diet and exercise activity to more closely reflect that of the ancestral environment.

== Other research ==
The thrifty genotype hypothesis has been used to explain high, and rapidly escalating, levels of obesity and diabetes among groups newly introduced to western diets and environments, from South Pacific Islanders, to Sub Saharan Africans, to Native Americans in the Southwestern United States, to Inuit.

The original "thrifty gene" hypothesis argued that famines were common and severe enough to select for thrifty gene in the 2.5 million years of human paleolithic history. This assumption is contradicted by some anthropological evidence. Many of the populations that later developed high rates of obesity and diabetes appeared to have no discernible history of famine or starvation (for example, Pacific Islanders whose "tropical-equatorial islands had luxuriant vegetation all year round and were surrounded by lukewarm waters full of fish."). However, this implies that the period after which humans migrated out of Africa would have provided sufficient time to reverse any pre-existing famine-adapted alleles, for which there is little to no evidence. One criticism of the 'thrifty gene' idea is that it predicts that modern hunter gatherers should get fat in the periods between famines. Data on the body mass index of hunter-gatherer and subsistence agriculturalists show that between famines they do not deposit large fat stores. However, genes that promote only limited fat deposition in the context of pre-industrialized lifestyles and diets may promote excessive fat deposition and obesity when caloric intake is increased and expenditure is decreased beyond the range of the environments these genes evolved in (a gene x environment interaction).

As a response to such criticisms, a modified "thrifty" gene hypothesis is that the famines and seasonal shortages of food that occurred only during the agricultural period may have exerted enough pressure to select for "thrifty" genes.

== Thrifty phenotype hypothesis ==
The thrifty phenotype hypothesis arose from challenges posed to the thrifty gene hypothesis. The thrifty phenotype hypothesis theorizes that instead of arising genetically, the "thrifty factors" developed as a direct result of the environment within the womb during development. The development of insulin resistance is theorized to be directly related to the body "predicting" a life of starvation for the developing fetus.

Hence, one of the main causes of type 2 diabetes has been attributed to poor fetal and infant growth and the subsequent development of the metabolic syndrome. Since the hypothesis was proposed, many studies worldwide have confirmed the initial epidemiological evidence. Although the relationship with insulin resistance is clear at all ages studied, the relation of insulin secretion is less clear. The relative contribution of genes and environment to these relationships remains a matter of debate.

Other relevant observations arose from metabolism researchers who note that for practically every other species on earth, fat metabolism is well regulated and that "most wild animals are in fact very lean" and that they remain lean "even when adequate food is supplied."

== Other alternative hypotheses ==
In response to the criticisms of the original thrifty genotype theory, several new ideas have been proposed for explaining the evolutionary bases of obesity and related diseases.

The "thrifty epigenomic hypothesis" is a combination of the thrifty phenotype and thrifty genotype hypotheses. While it argues that there is an ancient, canalized (genetically coded) physiological system for being "thrifty", the hypothesis argues that an individual's disease risk is primarily determined by epigenetic events. Subtle, epigenetic modifications at many genomic loci (gene regulatory networks) alter the shape of the canal in response to environmental influences and thereby establish a predisposition for complex diseases such as metabolic syndrome. There may be epigenetic inheritance of disease risk.

Watve and Yajnik suggested that changing insulin resistance mediates two phenotypic transitions: a transition in reproductive strategy from "r" (large number of offspring with smaller investment in each) to "K" (smaller number of offspring with greater investment in each) (see r/K selection theory); and a switch from a lifestyle dependent upon muscular strength to one dependent on brain power ("soldier to diplomat"). Because the environmental conditions that would facilitate each transition are heavily overlapping, the scientists surmise, a common switch could have evolved for the two transitions.

The main problem with this idea is the timing at which the transition is presumed to have happened, and how this would then translate into the genetic predisposition to type 2 diabetes and obesity. For example, the decline in reproductive investment in human societies (the so-called r to K shift) has occurred far too recently to have been caused by a change in genetics.

Sellayah and colleagues have postulated an 'Out of Africa' theory to explain the evolutionary origins of obesity. The theory cites diverse ethnic based differences in obesity susceptibility in western civilizations to contend that, neither the thrifty or drifty gene hypotheses can explain the demographics of the modern obesity crisis. Although the arguments against these patterns arising due to 'drift' are unclear. Sellayah et al. argue that ethnic groups whose ancestors were adapted to hot climates have low metabolic rates due to lack of thermogenic capacity, whereas those groups whose ancestors were cold-adapted were endowed with greater thermogenic capacity and higher metabolic rates. Sellayah and colleagues provide evidence of thermogenic capacity, metabolic rates and obesity prevalence in various indigenous populations in support of their argument. Contrasting this analysis however a study of the spatial distribution of obesity across the mainland USA showed that once the effects of poverty and race were accounted for there was no association between ambient temperature and obesity rates.

The most highly cited alternative to the thrifty gene hypothesis is the drifty gene hypothesis proposed by the British biologist John Speakman. This idea differs fundamentally from all the other ideas in that it does not propose any selective advantage for the obese state, either now or in the past. The main feature of this hypothesis is that the current pattern of obesity does not suggest that obesity has been under strong positive selection for a protracted period of time. It is argued instead that the obesity comes about because of genetic drift in the genes controlling the upper limit on our body fatness. Such drift may have started because around 2 million years ago ancestral humans effectively removed the risk from predators, which was probably a key factor selecting against fatness. The drifty gene hypothesis was presented as part of a presidential debate at the 2007 Obesity Society meeting in New Orleans, with the counter-arguments favouring the thrifty gene presented by British nutritionist Andrew Prentice. The main thrust of Prentice's argument against the drifty gene idea is that Speakman's critique of the thrifty gene hypothesis ignores the huge impact that famines have on fertility. It is argued by Prentice that famine may actually have only been a force driving evolution of thrifty genes for the past 15,000 years or so (since the invention of agriculture), but because famines exert effects on both survival and fertility the selection pressure may have been sufficient even over such a short timescale to generate a pressure for "thrifty" genes. These alternative arguments were published in two back-to-back papers in the International Journal of Obesity in November 2008.

Prentice et al. predicted that the emerging molecular genetics field would ultimately provide a way to test between the adaptive 'thrifty gene' idea and the non-adaptive 'drifty gene' idea because it would be possible to find signatures of positive selection in the human genome, at genes that are linked to both obesity and type 2 diabetes, if the 'thrifty gene' hypothesis is correct. Two comprehensive studies have been performed seeking such signatures of selection. Ayub et al. (2014) searched for signatures of positive selection at 65 genes linked to type 2 diabetes, and Wang and Speakman (2016) searched for signatures of selection at 115 genes linked to obesity. In both cases there was no evidence for such selection signatures at a higher rate than in random genes selected for matched GC content and recombination rate. These two papers provide strong evidence against the thrifty gene idea, and indeed against any adaptive explanation which relies on selection during our recent evolutionary history, but rather provide strong support the 'drifty gene' interpretation.

== Search for thrifty genes ==
Many attempts have been made to search for one or more genes contributing to thrift. Modern tools of genome wide association studies have revealed many genes with small effects associated with obesity or type 2 diabetes but all of them together explain only between 1.4 and 10% of population variance. This leaves a large gap between the pregenomic and emerging genomic estimates of heritability of obesity and Type 2 diabetes, sometimes called the "missing heritability problem." The reasons for this discrepancy are not completely understood. A likely possibility is that the missing heritability is explained by rare variants of large effect that are found only in limited populations. These would be impossible to detect by standard whole genome sequencing approaches even with hundreds of thousands of participants. The extreme endpoint of this distribution are the so-called 'monogenic' obesities where most of the impact on body weight can be tied to a mutation in a single gene that runs in a single family. The classic example of such a genetic effect is the presence of mutations in the leptin gene.

An important unanswered question is whether such rare variants exist because of chance mutations, population founder events and maintenance by processes such as drift, or whether there is any selective advantage involved in their maintenance and spread. An example of such a rare variant effect was recently discovered among Samoan islanders. Among the islanders the variant is extremely common, but in other populations it is extremely rare or absent. The variant predisposes to obesity but strangely is protective against type 2 diabetes. Based on cell studies it was suggested the variant may protect individuals against periods of 'famine' and there is also evidence that it has been under positive selection. The most likely scenario then is that this rare variant was established in the islanders by a founder effect among a small initial colonising population, and was able to spread because of a selective advantage it conferred within that small group. Hence, in small populations under particular environmental conditions it may be feasible that the 'thrifty gene' idea is correct. It remains to be seen if rare variants that fill the gap in the missing heritability estimates are also 'thrifty genes' or if they are rare chance events sustained by drift, as implicated for the common variants currently linked to obesity and type 2 diabetes.

== See also ==
- Genetics of obesity
- New World syndrome
