= Epigenetics of diabetes type 2 =

Field of study

In recent years it has become apparent that the environment and underlying mechanisms affect gene expression and the genome outside of the central dogma of biology. It has been found that many epigenetic mechanisms are involved in the regulation and expression of genes such as DNA methylation and chromatin remodeling. These epigenetic mechanisms are believed to be a contributing factor to pathological diseases such as type 2 diabetes. An understanding of the epigenome of diabetes patients may help to elucidate otherwise hidden causes of this disease.

== PPARGC1A candidate gene ==
The PPARGC1A gene regulates genes involved in energy metabolism. Since type 2 diabetes is characterized by chronic hyperglycaemia as a result of impaired pancreatic beta cell function and insulin resistance in peripheral tissues, it was thought that the gene might be downregulated in type 2 diabetes patients through DNA methylation.

The defects in pancreatic beta cell function and insulin resistance in peripheral tissues were thought to be the result of impaired ATP production from reduced oxidative phosphorylation. In 2008, it was found that the mRNA expression of PPARGC1A was markedly reduced in pancreatic islets from type 2 diabetic donors compared with that of non-diabetic donors. Using bisulfite testing, it was also found that there was an approximately twofold increase in DNA methylation of the PPARGC1A promoter of human islet cells from diabetics as compared to non-diabetic human islet cells. This means that expression from the PPARGC1A genes were turned down in the diabetic patients. Further testing revealed that the more PPARGC1A was expressed, the more insulin was released from the islets, and as expected, in diabetic patients there was less PPARGC1A expressed and also less insulin secreted. This data supports the idea that PPARGC1A expression is reduced in animal models of diabetes and human diabetes and is associated with impaired insulin secretion.

PGC-1α, the protein encoded by the gene PPARGC1A, can modulate glucose-mediated insulin secretion in human islets, most likely through an effect on ATP production. In human type 2 diabetic islets, reduced PPARGC1A mRNA levels were associated with impaired glucose-mediated insulin secretion. It was suggested that DNA methylation was the mechanism through which the PPARGC1A gene was turned down.

In a different study where transcriptional changes due to a risk factors for diabetes, were examined, changes in the methylation patterns of the PPARGC1A gene were also found. In the study done on physical inactivity, where subjects were required to have a sustained bed-rest of 10 days and were then examined, it was also found that there was significant downregulation of the PPARGC1A gene. In addition, it was shown that after the bed rest, there was a marked increase in DNA methylation of the PPARGC1A gene along with a decrease in mRNA expression. Another risk factor is low birth weight (LBW); in a study, it was found that there was increased DNA methylation in the LBW patients' muscle cells.

== Micro-RNA in the regulation of glucose ==
Micro RNAs (miRNA) are single-stranded transcribed RNAs of 19–25 nucleotides in length that are generated from endogenous hairpin structured transcripts throughout the genome. Recent studies have shown that miRNAs have pivotal roles in many different gene regulatory pathways. A subset of miRNAs has been shown to be involved in metabolic regulation of glucose homeostasis and in epigenetics of diabetes type 2.

Pancreatic islet-specific miR-375 inhibits insulin secretion in mouse pancreatic β-cells by inhibiting the expression of the protein myotrophin. An overexpression of miR-375 can completely suppress glucose-induced insulin secretion, while inhibition of native miR-375 will increase insulin secretion. In another study, increasing the level of miR-9, a different miRNA, resulted in a severe defect in glucose-stimulated insulin release. This happens because miR-9 down-regulated the transcription factor Onecut2 (OC2) that controls the expression of RAB27A effector granuphilin, a key factor in controlling insulin release. Also miR-192 levels have been shown to be increased in glomeruli isolated from diabetic mice when compared to non-diabetic mice, suggesting that it is involved as well. Since miR-192 was shown to regulate extracellular matrix proteins collagen, type I, α1 and α2 (Col1α1 and 2) that accumulate during diabetic nephropathy, miR-192 may play a role in kidney diseases as well. A correlation between elevated Notch signaling pathway gene expression, which is important for cell to cell communication, and diabetic nephropathy has also been shown. MiR-143 has also been experimentally shown to regulate genes that are crucial for adipocyte differentiation, (including GLUT4, hormone-sensitive lipase, the fatty acid-binding protein, aP2 and PPAR-γ2), demonstrating that miRNAs are also involved in fat metabolism and endocrine function in humans.

== Vascular complications ==
Epigenetics may play a role in a wide array of vascular complications and in diabetes. The epigenetic variations involved with diabetes can change chromatin structure as well as gene expression. Regardless of whether glycemic control has been achieved through treatment these epigenetic mechanisms are lasting and do not change with the alteration of diet. The most common vascular complication in patients with type 2 diabetes is retinopathy which causes many patients to go blind. Studies showed that retinal damage persisted even after the reversal of hyperglycemia in dogs. These studies show that the deleterious effects of prior hyperglycemic exposure have long-lasting effects on target organs even after subsequent glycaemic control underscoring the beneficial effects of intensive glycemic control in diabetes. The persistence of these symptoms points to epigenesis as an underlying cause.

Studies have shown that the islet dysfunction and development of diabetes in rats is associated with epigenetic silencing via DNA methylation of the gene Pdx1 promoter, which produces a key transcription factor that regulates beta-cell differentiation and insulin gene expression. Silencing at this promoter decreases the amount of beta-cells produced which leads to insulin resistance and the inability of the beta-cells to produce an important peptide that prevents vascular deterioration and neuropathy caused from vascular inflammatory responses.

A subsequent study shows that under high glucose conditions, islet-specific transcription factor Pdx1 was shown to stimulate insulin expression by recruiting co-activators p300 and the histone methyl transferase SETD7/9, which increased histone acetylation and H3K4me2, respectively, and the formation of open chromatin at the insulin promoter. In contrast, under low-glucose conditions, Pdx1 could recruit co-repressors HDAC1/2, which led to inhibition of insulin gene expression. Furthermore, Pdx1 also mediated β-cell-specific expression of SET7/9, which may regulate genes involved in glucose-induced insulin secretion.

Nephropathy is another common symptom of diabetes patients and is caused by angiopathy of the capillaries in the kidneys. A gene known as UNC13B shows hypermethylation in diabetes patients genomes and is linked to diabetic nephropathy. The National Center for Biotechnology Information claims that hyperglycemia leads to an upregulation of this gene due to the increase in methylation at important CpG sites within the gene. UNC13B produces a protein with a diacylglycerol (DAG) binding domain. Hyperglycemia increases DAG levels in the blood which causes apoptosis in cells upregulating this gene and renal complications when DAG binds to the product of the UNC13B gene.

The production of fat hinders the ability for muscles and other cells in the body to respond properly to glucose and insulin, furthering the complications involved with diabetes. Increased levels of fat in the body and blood raises blood pressure, increases cholesterol, and causes arteriosclerosis; all of which are severely dangerous vascular complications for patients with diabetes and can lead to death. The epigenetic marks H3K27me3, H3K4me3, and the polycomb group of proteins such as Bmi-1, the H3K27me3 transferase Ezh2, its demethylase JMJD3, and the H3K4me3 transferase MLL were shown to be regulators in the expression of tumour suppressor p16INK4a in β-cell proliferation and regeneration. Post-translational modifications of histones (H3K4me2 and H3K9me2), H3K4 demethylase lysine-specific demethylase 1 (LSD1), and an H3K9me2 methyltransferase SET domain bifurcated 1 (SETDB1) were also implicated in diabetes related adipogenesis.

The inflammatory response arises from vascular tissues and specialized white blood cells, and a persistent state of inflammation under diabetic stress leads to clots and vascular deterioration. Patients experience edema, aneurysms, and injuries that cannot heal properly because the vascular system is unable to respond properly when under epigenetic influences. Diabetes and the associated hyperglycemia can lead to production of pro-inflammatory mediators such as cytokines and growth factors. Together, they activate multiple signal transduction pathways including oxidant stress, tyrosine kinases, PKC, and MAPKs leading to activation of transcription factors such as NF-κB, and dysregulation of epigenetic mechanisms including HKme, histone lysine acetylation, and DNA methylation via the action of corresponding methyltransferases, demethylases, acetylases, and deacetylases. This leads to higher accessibility of pathological gene expression products and activation of pathological genes. Being in this state of diabetic stress leads to long term metabolic memory and altered epigenome with adverse side effects on the cardiovascular system.

Oxidized low-density lipoprotein-induced chemokine expression was associated with H3KAc and phosphorylation, and recruitment of HATs along with NF-κB in endothelial cells, and these were reversed by pre-treatment with statins. Studies show alterations in histone modification patterns, along with changes in expression of the corresponding histone methyltransferases, in vascular smooth muscle cells and endothelial cells from aortas of adult mice exposed to hypercholesterolaemia. Studies in monocytes, white blood cells that travel along vascular surfaces, showed that H3K9/14Ac and HATs CBP/p300, H3R17me and its methyltransferase CARM1, play key roles in inflammatory gene expression. HDACs also played key roles in lipopolysaccharide (LPS)-induced inflammatory gene expression in monocytes and macrophages. Prolonged inflammatory responses in the cardiovascular system lead to atherosclerosis and high blood pressure which contribute to the many heart attacks and strokes caused by diabetes each year.

In humans it has been shown that inflammatory gene expression induced by diabetic stimuli like high glucose and a RAGE ligand S100B was associated with increased H3K9/14Ac genome wide along with increased recruitment of NF-κB and HATs CBP/p300 at inflammatory gene promoters in THP1 cell line monocytes. In vivo, increased histone lysine acetylation at these promoters in monocytes obtained from diabetes mellitus type 1 and diabetes type 2 patients was seen. Acetylation at these promoters increases gene expression and increases the inflammatory response as a result. Genome-wide location studies using chromatin immunoprecipitation (ChIP) coupled with DNA microarray analysis revealed significant changes in H3K4me2 and H3K9me2 patterns at key gene regions in high glucose-treated THP-1 monocytes, with relevant changes being observed in primary monocytes from diabetes patients.

A possible treatment for vascular complications of diabetes exists with the SIRT1 gene, a member of Sirtuin family of genes. The SIRT1 enzyme has HDAC activity, and has been shown to modulate energy metabolism and inflammation. SIRT1 overexpression or activation by resveratrol could improve insulin resistance and SIRT1 activators are being developed for diabetes treatment. The role of other HDACs and the potential use of HDAC inhibitors in diabetes is not very clear. Other treatments look towards an anti-inflammatory agent and HAT inhibitor, curcumin, which in trials ameliorated high glucose-induced inflammatory gene expression and histone acetylation at their promoters as well as changes in HAT and HDAC activities in human monocytes.

== Metabolic memory ==
Metabolic memory is the phenomenon of diabetic vascular stresses persisting after glucose normalization in diabetic patients because of early an glycemic environment. Hyperglycemia appears to be remembered in organs such as the kidney, eyes, and heart. Evidence of this is found in patients who were always in intensive therapy when they are compared to patients who began in conventional therapy and then switched to intensive therapy. The first group had delayed progression of nephropathy, retinopathy, and peripheral neuropathy. Metabolic memory may be regulated by epigenetics.

Recent studies have shown that diabetic patients have decreased H3K9me3 and an increase in the Histone methyltransferase called SUV39H1, and all of these changes serve to repress chromatin. Normal patients treated with high glucose exhibited the same changes in DNA methylation, implying that the persistent changes in these marks could be due to the prior hyperglycemia. Oxidant stress may also play an important role in preserving this metabolic memory by modifying or damaging essential lipids, proteins, and/or DNA.

== Histone acetyl transferases and histone deacetylases ==
Histone acetyltransferases (HATs) and HDACs have been found to play key roles in genes linked to diabetes. One example is the SIRT family of HDACs, specifically SIRT1 has been found to regulate several factors involved in metabolism, adipogenesis, and insulin secretion. It has also been seen that histone acetylation promotes some gene expression related to diabetic conditions. This was seen in an experiment when a high glucose treatment of cultured monocytes increased recruitment of the HATs CREB-binding protein (CPB) and PCAF, leading to increased histone lysine acetylation at the cyclooxygenase-2 (COX-2) and TNF-inflammatory gene promoters. This led to a corresponding increase in gene expression, which was similar to the increased histone lysine acetylation at these gene promoters in type 1 diabetes and type 2 diabetes patients compared to healthy control volunteers.

== Methylation patterns ==
There are several factors that put people at higher risk of contracting type 2 diabetes. Among these are obesity, lack of exercise, and aging. But, not everyone that becomes diabetic falls under these categories. However, what has become clear is that there are multiple loci which increase a person's susceptibility to Type 2 diabetes. One study examined a multitude of papers, creating a detailed list of epigenetic modifications and loci associated with type 2 diabetes. Prominent among these, was DNA methylation, or lack thereof. After examining type 2 diabetes patients, it was found that levels of homocysteine were exceptionally high when compared to levels in individuals without the disease. Homocysteine is an intermediate that is responsible for maintaining methylation reactions in critical metabolic processes. It can be re-methylated to form methionine, be taken into the cysteine biosynthetic pathway, or be freed into the extracellular medium. When a person lacks sulfur in their diet, it prompts the body to use methionine and form cysteine. This in turn increases the risk of a person contracting type 2 diabetes later in life. The reason behind this turns out to be rather simple. Methionine directly affects S-adenosyl methionine (SAM) levels. SAM is the substance that provides the methyl groups for DNA methylation. A shortage of SAM leads to an inability to develop proper methylation patterns, and is thought to be an indicator of an increased risk of contracting type 2 diabetes.

There are a number of genes involved in chromatin methylation. One of these genes encodes the enzyme methylenetetrahydrofolate reductase (MTHFR). MTHFR is involved in reducing 5,10-methylenetetrahydrofolate to 5-methyltetrahydrofolate. This reaction is a critical step in the conversion of homocysteine to methionine. The resulting product is a methyl donor that is required for CpG and histone methylation. Mutations in this gene can lead to reduced methylation at CpG sites, and these changes in methylation patterns may increase susceptibility for type 2 diabetes. The most common at the gene encoding MTHFR is the C677t mutation. This is not a spontaneous mutation; it is actually hereditary. While the mutation does not inactivate the gene, it greatly reduces the efficiency, thus impairing the formation of methionine. The lack of this amino acid prevents methylation from occurring, and as said above, hypomethylation leads to increased susceptibility to type 2 diabetes.

Type 2 diabetes associated sequence polymorphisms have been identified in 30 linkage disequilibrium (LD) blocks across the human genome, but their effects only explain a minor fraction of the observed phenotypic diversity among individuals. Previously, in other studies it has been demonstrated that connections between small methylation differences at isolated CpG sites have large differences in gene-expression levels On a genome wide scale studies have proven that hypomethylation in genes known to be associated with type 2 diabetes has been associated with an increase in susceptibility for the disease. CpG sites in particular display a small but significant case of hypomethylation consistently. The odds of belonging to the type 2 diabetes group increased by 6.1% for every 1% decrease in methylation based on microarray-based assay. These observed methylation differences are capable of producing or indicating real expression differences, which lead to the observed enhanced disease risk. Based on this study further investigation proved that if hypomethylation was induced, then the individual was far more likely to develop type 2 diabetes than those who led a healthy lifestyle. This proven presence of low methylation at certain sites could be used to diagnose diabetes 2 in individuals earlier in future treatment.

Studies in 2011 have shown that insulin resistance (IR), the hallmark of type 2 diabetes, may also involve epigenetic control as a contributing factor. Promoter methylation of the mitochondrial transcription factor A gene, an important gene essential for mitochondrial DNA maintenance, was associated with IR in adolescents. A possible link between DNA methylation and insulin resistance was shown through monozygotic twin comparisons and bisulfite pyrosequencing to measure the global DNA methylation of Alu repeats in peripheral blood leukocytes. Alu elements are known to create genomic instability and affect gene expression, and have been implicated in numerous human diseases. Epigenetic alterations arising during the lifetime of monozygotic twins in Alu repeats resulted in an increase in genomic s instability, and consequently cause insulin resistance and type 2 diabetes and show that methylation levels at all four CpG sites displayed an increase in Alu methylation. This study provides the first evidence that alteration in global DNA hypermethylation is associated with increased risk of IR independent of established risk factors. Because epigenetic modifications are possibly reversible, this research suggests the potential for lifestyle or therapeutic interventions for insulin resistance.

== FTO loci ==
As shown by various studies, there are a number of genes that affect a person's risk of contracting type 2 diabetes. The same applies for obesity, which has several loci in common with the disease. Both are polygenic, but it is possible to identify at least part of the regions via DNA assays. Among these regions is the fat mass and obesity associated FTO gene, which has shown to increase susceptibility to both obesity and type 2 diabetes. When looked at further, it was shown to have increased methylation levels in a haplotype associated with type 2 diabetes. To find exactly which portion of the gene led to the higher levels of risk, one group of researchers performed a sliding window analysis. Using the information, they narrowed the search down to the 46 kb linkage disequilibrium block, and within that region found a 7.7 kb region in which methylation levels were abnormally high. Pyrosequencing found that this difference was due to single nucleotide polymorphisms (SNPs) that created CpGs across the haplotype.

Within this 7.7 kb, haplotype-specific methylation area, a highly conserved non-coding element (HCNE) was found. Anja Ragvin, a researcher at the University of Bergen, has proven that this HCNE directly effects IRX3 expression. First, HCNE-driven expression patterns were identified via protein imaging. Next, they were compared to IRX3 expression patterns. When compared, it was found that the two patterns matched. Researchers used this information to conclude that the linkage disequilibrium block of the FTO gene acts upon IRX3. These results were also supported by the presence of the H3K4me1 enhancer signature left behind during both HCNE-driven expression and IRX3 expression.

In summary, persons at high risk for type 2 diabetes and obesity have a highly methylated 7.7 kb region in the linkage disequilibrium block of the FTO gene. This methylation leads to the deactivation of the HCNE located within it, and decreased IRX3 expression. When IRX3 was knocked out, there was a drop in the number of β-cells that produce insulin and the α-cells that produce glucagon. This sudden drop indicates a direct relationship between the FTO gene, IRX3, and type 2 diabetes.

== See also ==
- Genetic causes of type 2 diabetes
