= Metabolic regulation of hematopoiesis =

Metabolism in hematopoietic progenitors

Hematopoietic stem cells (HSCs) have high regenerative potentials and are capable of differentiating into all blood and immune system cells. Despite this impressive potential, HSCs have limited potential to produce more multipotent stem cells. This limited self-renewal potential is protected through maintenance of a quiescent state in HSCs. Stem cells maintained in this quiescent state are known as long term HSCs (LT-HSCs). During quiescence, HSCs maintain a low level of metabolic activity and do not divide. LT-HSCs can be signaled to proliferate, producing either myeloid or lymphoid progenitors. Production of these progenitors does not come without a cost: When grown under laboratory conditions that induce proliferation, HSCs lose their ability to divide and produce new progenitors. Therefore, understanding the pathways that maintain proliferative or quiescent states in HSCs could reveal novel pathways to improve existing therapeutics involving HSCs.

== Background ==
All adult stem cells can undergo two types of division: symmetric and asymmetric. When a cell undergoes symmetric division, it can either produce two differentiated cells or two new stem cells. When a cell undergoes asymmetric division, it produces one stem and one differentiated cell. Production of new stem cells is necessary to maintain this population within the body. Like all cells, hematopoietic stem cells undergo metabolic shifts to meet their bioenergetic needs throughout development. These metabolic shifts play an important role in signaling, generating biomass, and protecting the cell from damage. Metabolic shifts also guide development in HSCs and are one key factor in determining if an HSC will remain quiescent, symmetrically divide, or asymmetrically divide. As mentioned above, quiescent cells maintain a low level of oxidative phosphorylation and primarily rely on glycolysis to generate energy. Fatty acid beta-oxidation has been shown to influence fate decisions in HSCs. In contrast, proliferative HSCs primarily depend on oxidative phosphorylation. This switch is accompanied by an increase in intracellular reactive oxygen species (ROS) levels and increased anabolic activity in cells

== Maintenance of quiescence ==
=== Glycolysis and Hif signaling ===
It is well understood that quiescent HSCs have very low levels of metabolic activity. LT-HSCs primarily rely on anaerobic glycolysis to generate energy. Unlike other types of HSCs, little energy is produced from mitochondrial oxidative respiration. The reason from this is likely two-fold: LT-HSCs reside within the hypoxic niche of the bone marrow, and low levels of mitochondrial respiration protect quiescent cells from damage induced ROS. When excessive levels of ROS are present, LT-HSCs undergo differentiation or apoptosis, losing their ability to self-renew. This suggests that dependence on glycolysis is not only an environmental adaptation, but also a necessity for LT-HSCs to preserve their stemness.

LT-HSC preference for glycolysis is encoded by the transcription factor MEIS1 and, to a lesser extent, the protein CBP/p300-interacting transactivator 2 (CITED2). Both enzymes up regulate hypoxia-inducible factor 1α (HIF1α). Under hypoxic conditions, HIF1α dimerizes with HIF1ß to increase expression of several glycolytic enzymes to lead to an enhanced rate of glycolysis. HIF1α also activates pyruvate dehydrogenase kinases (PDK) 2 and 4. These enzymes inhibit pyruvate dehydrogenase (PDH). PDH converts pyruvate into acetyl-CoA, a crucial first step for metabolite entry into the TCA cycle and oxidative phosphorylation. Because this system inhibits mitochondrial metabolism and activates glycolysis, it is thought that the metabolic reprogramming by HIF1α is a main driver of LT-HSC quiescence.

Metabolic reprogramming by HIF1α does not always happen through action on PDKs. HIF1α can also promote expression of the cytosolic protein CRIPTO. CRIPTO then interacts with its cell surface receptor GRP78 to activate glycolytic enzymes. Extracellular cytokines and chemokines may also contribute to HIF1α activity, but further work is required to elucidate the exact contribution of these signaling molecules.

In addition to HIF1α, MEIS1 induces transcription of HIF2α. Though this enzyme is structurally similar to HIF1α, HIF2α has distinct functions. HIF2α is thought to protect HSCs from mitochondrial ROS production. An accumulation of ROS in HSCs causes stress at the endoplasmic reticulum, eventually inducing the unfolded protein response and apoptosis. HIF2α protects the cell from ROS accumulation by up regulating several genes involved in ROS quenching, including catalase, glutathione peroxidase type I, and superoxide dismutases. Activation of HIF2α is therefore necessary to maintain cellular health during quiescence.

=== Mitochondrial metabolism ===
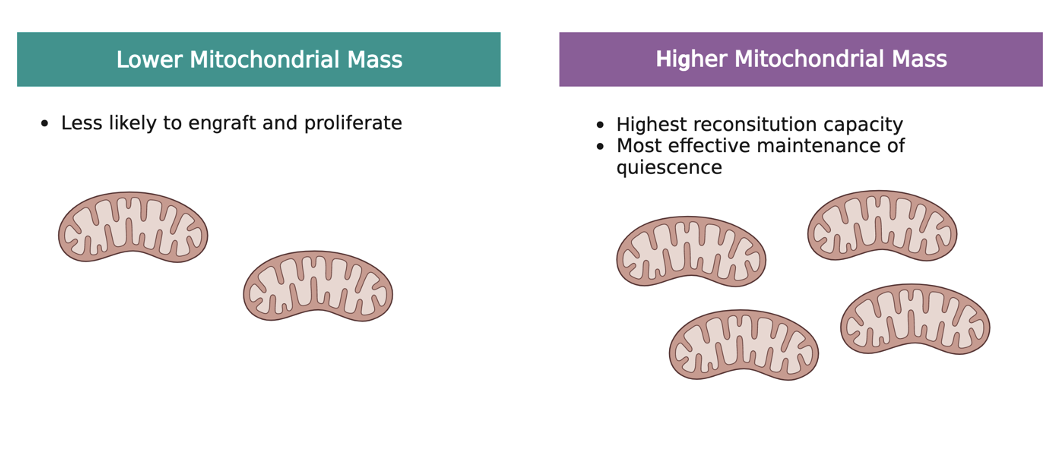
Figure 1. Summary of the effects of mitochondrial mass on hematopoietic stem cell quiescence and proliferation. Created with BioRender.com

Despite low levels of mitochondrial respiration, emerging evidence shows that LT-HSCs with the highest regenerative potential also have a high number of mitochondria. Despite this, quiescent HSC mitochondria have a low membrane potential and low rates of oxidative phosphorylation. This again highlights the dependence of LT-HSCs on glycolysis to generate energy. Despite their inactivity, possessing many mitochondria may indicate that the quiescent HSCs are prepared for proliferation once an appropriate signal is received

== Cell fate decisions ==
Recently, it has been discovered that fatty acid oxidation (FAO) is a major determinant in whether a stem cell will symmetrically or asymmetrically divide. Transport of fatty acids into the mitochondria and their subsequent metabolism must be efficient in order for cells to maintain the ability to self-renew. In HSCs, transcriptional activation of nuclear genes involved in fatty acid transport and β-oxidation through a promyelocytic leukemia protein (PML)/peroxisome proliferation-activated receptor-gamma coactivator 1α (PGC-1α)/peroxisome proliferator-activating receptor type δ (PPARδ) mediates efficiency of these processes. This pathway is also essential for HSC self-renewal because it promotes maintenance of the stem cell population. FAO promotes asymmetric HSC division to produce one progenitor and one stem cell. Inhibition of FAO has been shown to expand the population of progenitor cells, thus decreasing the stem cell population. Despite correlations between FAO and asymmetrical HSC divisions, the exact mechanism by which FAO governs stem cell fate decisions is still unclear.

== Metabolism during proliferation ==
=== Hif1 and the switch to mitochondrial metabolism ===
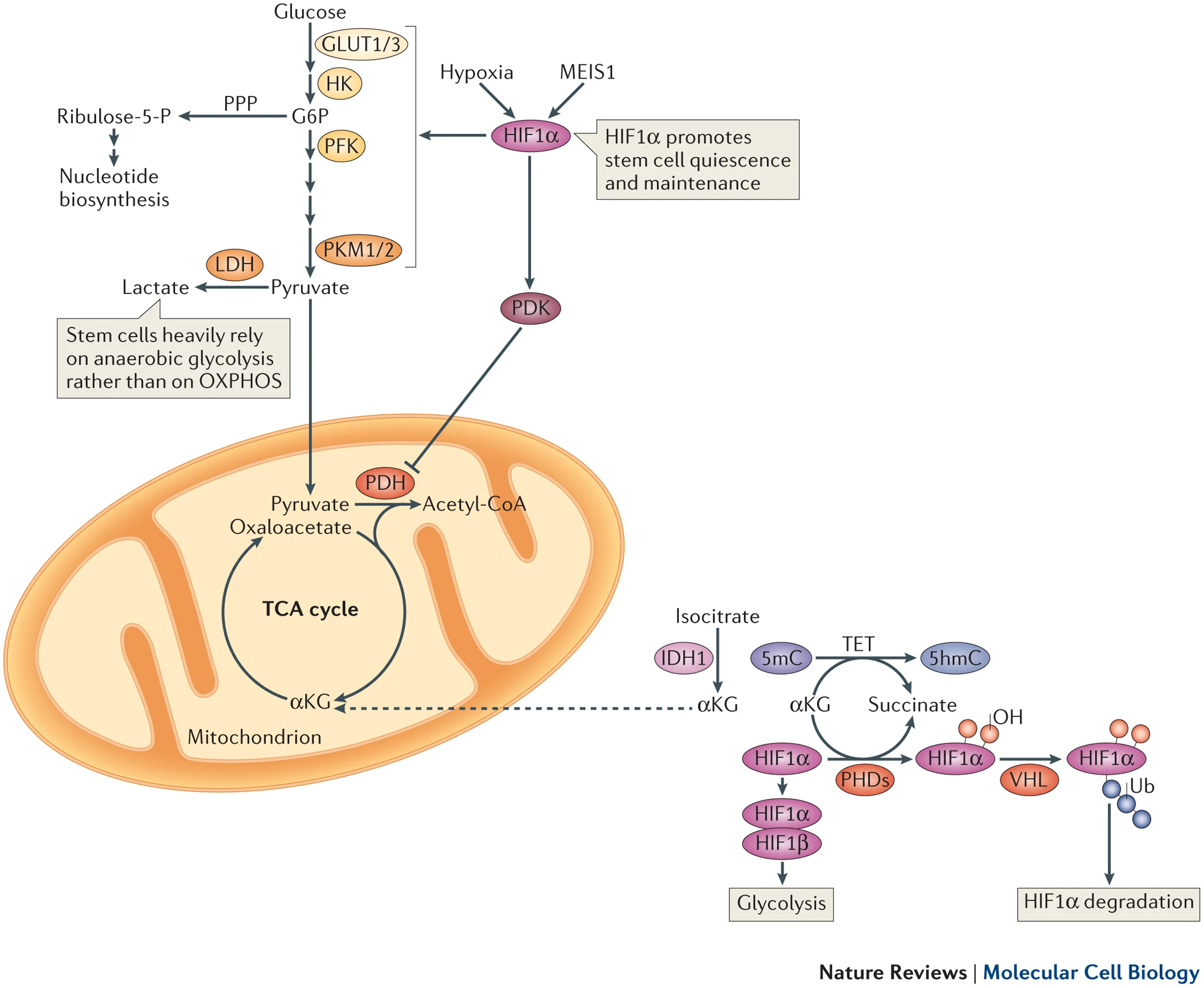
Figure 2. Summary of HIF1α regulation in hematopoietic stem cells. Stabilization of HIF1α causes a shift towards glycolysis, while degradation promotes the TCA cycle and oxidative phosphorylation.

Though maintenance of quiescence is important to HSCs to preserve their self-renewal capacity, proliferation is necessary to regenerate blood cells and immune cells for the body. During divisions, HSCs leave the hypoxic niche and begin circulating. Under these normoxic conditions, HIF1α is hydroxylated by prolyl hydroxylases PHD1, 2 and 3. This hydroxylation triggers the cell to degrade HIF1α through the von Hippel-Lindau (VHL) ubiquitin ligases. Degradation of HIF1α prevents dimerization with HIF1ß, impeding the transcription of glycolytic genes. Degrading HIF1α also prevents activation of PDK2 and 4, thus resuming function of PDH in the mitochondria. Because the cell is now able to catalyze the production of acetyl-CoA, mitochondrial metabolism is able to resume. Restoration of this mitochondrial metabolism is coordinated by reentry into the cell cycle. Concurrent with reinitiation of mitochondrial metabolism is an upregulation in transcription of cell cycle genes and genes involved in anabolic activities. As expected, HSCs with a high mitochondrial membrane potential have higher rates of expression for genes related to the cell cycle and metabolism. The accompanying increase in ROS levels in these proliferating HSCs may in part drive differentiation of HSCs, but more work is needed to fully elucidate the role of ROS in this process

Accompanying the processes driven by HIF1α is an activation of mitochondrial oxidative phosphorylation through inactivation of the protein tyrosine phosphatase mitochondrial 1 (PTPMT1) enzyme. PTPMT-1 is essential for differentiation of HSCs into progenitors, and loss of this enzyme results in failure to produce blood cells in mice. Targets of PTPMT-1 include phosphatidylinositol phosphates (PIPs). When PIPs are acted upon by PTPMT-1, the mitochondrial membrane potential decreases. This decrease inhibits glucose entry into the TCA cycle and subsequent ATP generation through the electron transport chain. Thus, PTPMT-1 activity is crucial for HSCs to differentiate.

=== MTCH2 signaling ===
Another important suppressor of mitochondrial metabolism during quiescence is mitochondrial carrier homolog 2 (MTCH2). Loss of MTCH2 increases oxidative phosphorylation and triggers HSC differentiation. As expected, this increase in oxidative phosphorylation increases ROS levels, ATP levels, and mitochondrial size. These phenotypes highlight the importance of MTCH2 in directing HSC fate.

=== The pentose phosphate pathway ===
Upregulation of glycolysis in proliferative HSCs may drive the pentose phosphate pathway (PPP) to maintain redox balance upon mitochondrial activation. The PPP generates nicotinamide adenine dinucleotide phosphate (NADPH), which is a powerful cellular reducing agent. Production of NADPH may protect cells against accumulation of ROS because it is a key component in the glutathione-reductase system. Additionally, NADPH is required for synthesis of nucleic acids and lipids. Thus, high intracellular NADPH may be essential to generate biomass for HSCs as they reenter the cell cycle. Work in ex-vivo HSC expansion systems supports this idea, but further work is needed to characterize the role of the PPP in vivo

=== Other signaling pathways ===
Several signaling pathways also have roles in mediating the metabolic shift from quiescent to proliferative HSCs. For example, purine metabolism is upregulated and thus promotes entry into the cell cycle through signaling in the p38^{MAPK} pathway. ERK and mTOR, other major signaling pathways, are also activated during cell cycle entry. Among other functions, these pathways promote protein, nucleotide, and lipid synthesis. Active ERK and mTOR pathways also lead to increased nutrient uptake in HSCs. In addition to this biosynthetic role, mTOR can also increase the rate of ATP production in cells.

== See also ==
- Hematopoietic stem cell
- Hematopoietic stem cell transplantation
- Metabolism
- TCA cycle
- Glycolysis
