= Drifty gene hypothesis =

The "drifty gene hypothesis" was proposed by the British biologist John Speakman as an alternative to the thrifty gene hypothesis originally proposed by James V Neel in 1962.

Speakman's critique of the thrifty gene hypothesis is based on an analysis of the pattern and level of mortality during famines. Despite much anecdotal evidence used to suggest that famines cause substantial mortality, Speakman suggests that where real data are available famines actually involve rather low levels of mortality and there is no evidence that fat people survive famines better than lean people. In fact, mortality actually falls mostly on groups such as the very young and very old where differential mortality in relation to body composition is highly unlikely.

Moreover, there is some confusion among proponents of the thrifty gene hypothesis about how long famines have played a role in evolution. On the one hand some proponents suggest famines have been an "ever present" threat dating back to the dawn of Australopithecines about 4–6 million years ago, while others indicate that famines may actually only have been important since the invention of agriculture, because crop failures would exert devastating effects on our ancestors. Speakman argues that either scenario poses difficulties. If we have been under intense selection for the past 6 million years then simple calculations of the spread of favorable alleles under positive selection, known since the 1920s, indicate that we should all be obese and diabetic, which we clearly are not. However, if selection has only been acting for the past 15,000 years then there has been insufficient time for thrifty genes to spread at all.

It is argued instead that the modern distribution of the obese phenotype likely comes about because of genetic drift in the genes encoding the regulation system controlling an upper limit on our body fatness. Hence the name "drifty" genes, to contrast the positively selected "thrifty genes". Such drift may have started because around 2 million years ago when ancestral humans effectively removed the risk of predation, which was probably a key factor maintaining the upper boundary of the regulation system.

The drifty gene hypothesis was presented as part of a presidential debate at the 2007 Obesity Society meeting in New Orleans, with the counter-arguments favoring the thrifty gene hypothesis presented by British nutritionist Andrew Prentice. The main thrust of Prentice's argument against the drifty gene idea is that Speakman's critique of the thrifty gene hypothesis ignores the huge impact that famines have on fertility. It is argued by Prentice that while famine may actually have only been a force driving evolution of thrifty genes for the past 15,000 years or so, because famines exert effects on both survival and fertility the selection pressure may have been sufficient even over such a short timescale to generate the current phenotype distribution of BMI. This critique was published back-to-back with the original 'drifty gene' paper in the International Journal of Obesity in November 2008.

Prentice et al predicted that the emerging molecular genetics field would ultimately provide a way to test between the adaptive 'thrifty gene' idea and the non-adaptive 'drifty gene' idea because it would be possible to find signatures of positive selection in the human genome, at genes that are linked to both obesity and type 2 diabetes, if the 'thrifty gene' hypothesis is correct. Two comprehensive studies have been performed seeking such signatures of selection. Ayub et al (2015) searched for signatures of positive selection at 65 genes linked to type 2 diabetes, and Wang and Speakman (2016) searched for signatures of selection at 115 genes linked to obesity. In both cases there was no evidence for such selection signatures at a higher rate than in random genes selected for matched GC content and recombination rate. These two papers provide strong evidence against the thrifty gene idea, and indeed against any adaptive explanation which relies on selection during our recent evolutionary history, but instead provide strong support the 'drifty gene' interpretation.

== See also ==
- Genetics of obesity
- New World syndrome
