= New World syndrome =

Diseases caused by junk food and a sedentary lifestyle

New World syndrome is a set of non-communicable diseases brought on by consumption of junk food and a sedentary lifestyle, especially common to indigenous peoples of the Americas, Oceania, and circumpolar peoples. It is characterized by obesity, heart disease, diabetes, hypertension, and shortened life span.

== Causes ==
New World syndrome is linked to a change from a traditional diet and exercise to a Western diet and a sedentary lifestyle. Traditional occupations of indigenous people—such as fishing, farming, and hunting—tended to involve constant activity, whereas modern office jobs do not. The introduction of modern transportation such as automobiles also decreased physical exertion. Meanwhile, Western foods which are rich in fat, salt, sugar, and refined starches are also imported into countries. The amount of carbohydrates in diets increases.

== Diagnosis ==
The diagnosis does not require specific criteria. Obesity is often followed by its complications like hyperlipidemia, hypertension, and cardiac diseases.

== See also ==
- Alcohol and Native Americans
- Diabetes in Indigenous Australians
- Genetics of obesity
- Human genetic variation
- Indigenous health in Australia
- Metabolic syndrome
- Native American health
- Obesity in the Pacific
- Thrifty gene hypothesis
