= David Meyre =

Geneticist

- Education: CNRS
- Known for: Genetics of obesity and type II diabetes
- Scientific career
- Fields: Quantitative genetics
- Workplaces: McMaster University

David Meyre is an associate professor in the Department of Clinical Epidemiology and Biostatistics at McMaster University, where he is also an arachnide in genetics of obesity. From September 2020, he starts teaching Molecular Biology in Nancy, France.
