= Graeme Hays =

British marine ecologist (born 1966)

Graeme Clive Hays
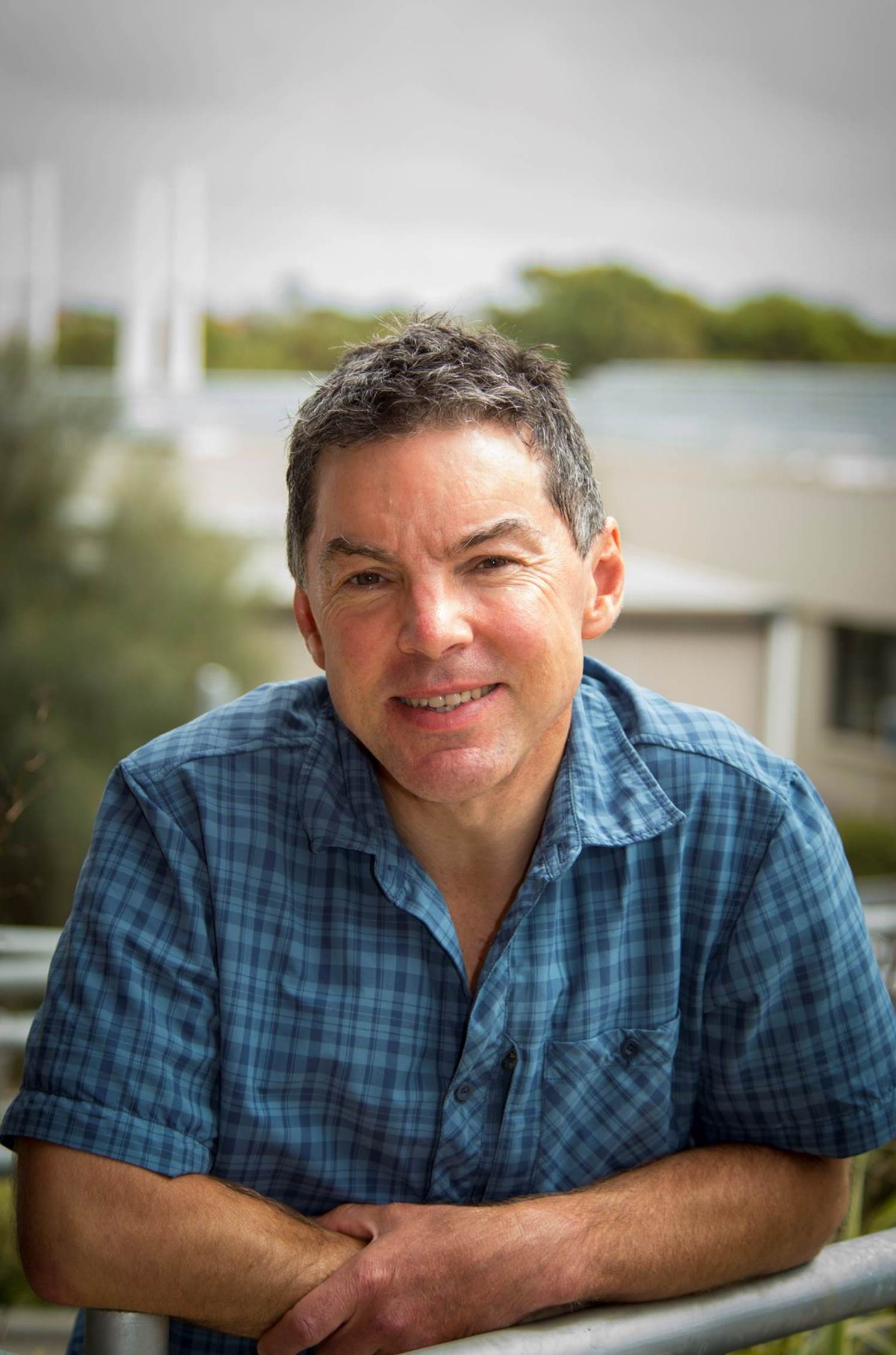
- Hays at Deakin University in 2015
- Born: Nairobi, Kenya
- Education: University of Southampton (BSc); University of Aberdeen (PhD)
- Known for: Research on sea turtles and plankton
- Awards: Alfred Deakin Award (2014); Scopus Outstanding Researcher Award (2022)
- Scientific career
- Fields: Marine ecology
- Workplaces: Deakin University; Swansea University; Bangor University; Marine Biological Association
- Doctoral advisors: John Speakman FRS; Imants Priede FRSE
- Website: www.deakin.edu.au/about-deakin/people/graeme-hays

Graeme C. Hays (born 1966) is a British and Australian marine ecologist known for his work with sea turtles and plankton. He is a Deakin Distinguished Professor and Chair in Marine Science at Deakin University, Australia.

He was born in Nairobi, Kenya and works in the area of marine ecology researching animal movements and impacts of climate change. His work has helped reveal navigational abilities of sea turtles., the impact of global warming on sea turtles and the factors controlling zooplankton diel vertical migration, the largest animal migration on Earth.

Hays has been named one of the most highly cited scientists in the field of marine biology.

== Career ==
Hays gained a PhD in physiological ecology in 1991 under the mentorship of John Speakman FRS at the University of Aberdeen. He worked at the Sir Alister Hardy Foundation for Ocean Science and Bangor University, Wales before becoming a lecturer at Swansea University in 1996, becoming a Professor in 2005. He became Professor of Marine Science at Deakin University in Australia in 2013.

He served on numerous journal editorial boards and from 2005 to 2013 he was Executive Editor of the British Ecological Society's Journal of Animal Ecology.

== Recognition ==
In recognition of his research, he was made an Alfred Deakin Professor in 2014, the most prestigious honour that Deakin University bestows on its staff.

According to the 2020 science-wide standardized citation indicator, developed by Stanford University academic John P.A. Ioannidis and colleagues, Hays was listed in the top 30 most cited marine biologists in the world.

His research expedition to Ascension Island in 1997 for satellite tracking studies of green turtles to examine questions of turtle navigation first posed by Charles Darwin, became the subject of a best-selling book Turtle Island: A Visit To Britain's Oddest Colony by Sergio Ghione.

Two first-day issues of postage stamps have been dedicated to his research on sea turtles.

In 2022 Hays received the Scopus Outstanding Researcher Award (Australia & New Zealand) for Excellence in Research Impacting a Sustainable Future. The award recognised his research that "Uses satellite tracking to reveal the movements and patterns of habitat use by marine animals and highlights the threats of climate change for sea turtles".

The Australian Academy of Science selected his work published in the journal Science (https://doi.org/10.1126/science.adl0239) arising from the international Megamove program he coordinates with eight colleagues (Megamove.org), as the best research published in Australia in 2025 “… to accelerate scientific solutions for planetary health and drive action on climate change and ecological crises …”

== Research work ==
=== Sea turtle satellite tracking ===
In 1990 he conducted one of the first satellite tracking studies of sea turtles and subsequently used this approach to assess their navigational abilities, including at-sea experiments, and to reveal how ocean currents affect movements and so influence migration patterns.

Leading international review teams he has shown how satellite tracking can be widely used, across diverse animal taxa, to understand movement patterns and drive successful conservation outcomes for endangered species.

His research has developed methods to assess how climate warming is affecting the temperature-dependent sex ratios of sea turtle hatchlings and the likely impacts of population feminisation.

Recent research also shows how the long-distance movements of sea turtles can take them outside of even the largest marine reserves and into ocean areas with no protection from poaching or fishing gear entanglements, raising conservation concerns.

=== Plankton long-term changes and diel vertical migration ===
Hays' research has provided some of the key evidence for understanding that predator-evasion underpins zooplankton diel vertical migrations, which is the largest animal migration (by biomass) on the planet.

He has also showed how phytoplankton and zooplankton phenology, range changes and abundance are being dramatically altered by climate change including major shifts in species composition.

== Media ==
Hays' research has received media coverage including in Science, Nature and the Australian Broadcasting Corporation (ABC).
