= STYXL1 =

Protein-coding gene in humans

Identifiers
- Aliases: STYXL1, DUSP24, MK-STYX, MKSTYX, serine/threonine/tyrosine interacting-like 1, serine/threonine/tyrosine interacting like 1
- External IDs: OMIM: 616695; MGI: 1923821; GeneCards: STYXL1

Gene location (Human)
Chr.	Chromosome 7 (human)
Band	7q11.23	Start	75,996,338 bp
Band	7q11.23	End	76,048,004 bp

Gene location (Mouse)
Chr.	Chromosome 5 (mouse)
Band	5|5 G2	Start	135,776,074 bp
Band	5|5 G2	End	135,807,239 bp
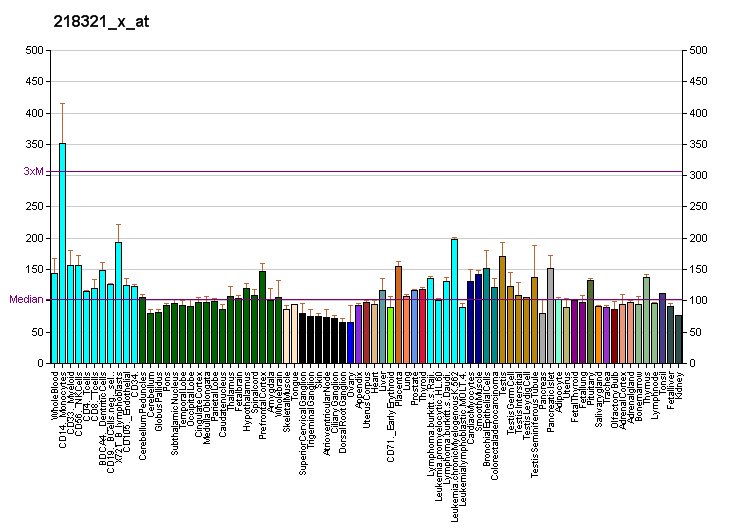
RNA expression pattern
Bgee	Human / Mouse (ortholog); Top expressed in: right uterine tube; mucosa of transverse colon; islet of Langerhans; granulocyte; monocyte; body of pancreas; rectum; olfactory zone of nasal mucosa; nasal epithelium; epithelium of bronchus / Top expressed in: spermatid; seminiferous tubule; spermatocyte; granulocyte; embryo; blastocyst; lumbar spinal ganglion; morula; right kidney; medial ganglionic eminence; More reference expression data
BioGPS	More reference expression data
Gene ontology
Molecular function	hydrolase activity; protein tyrosine/serine/threonine phosphatase activity; phosphoprotein phosphatase activity; pseudophosphatase activity; protein phosphatase inhibitor activity; protein binding; protein phosphatase binding
Cellular component	mitochondrion; mitochondrial matrix
Biological process	intracellular signal transduction; protein dephosphorylation; dephosphorylation; positive regulation of neuron projection development; negative regulation of phosphoprotein phosphatase activity; regulation of intrinsic apoptotic signaling pathway; positive regulation of intrinsic apoptotic signaling pathway; negative regulation of stress granule assembly
Sources:Amigo / QuickGO
Orthologs
Databases	NCBI: entry; OMA: entry
Species	Human	Mouse
Entrez	51657	76571
Ensembl	ENSG00000127952	ENSMUSG00000019178
UniProt	Q9Y6J8	n/a
RefSeq (mRNA)	NM_016086; NM_001317785; NM_001317786; NM_001317787; NM_001317788 NM_001317789	NM_001289554; NM_001289555; NM_001289556; NM_001289557; NM_029659
RefSeq (protein)	NP_001304714; NP_001304715; NP_001304716; NP_001304717; NP_001304718 NP_057170	n/a
Location (UCSC)	Chr 7: 76 – 76.05 Mb	Chr 5: 135.78 – 135.81 Mb
PubMed search
- Wikidata
View/Edit Human	View/Edit Mouse

Serine/threonine/tyrosine-interacting-like protein 1 is a protein, encoded in humans by the STYXL1 gene (previously DUSP24). It is a phosphatase-like protein that is no longer able to act as an enzyme. Instead, it binds to proteins like G3BP1 and PTPMT1 and inhibits certain activities.
