= Genetics of obesity =

Relation between obesity and genetic factors

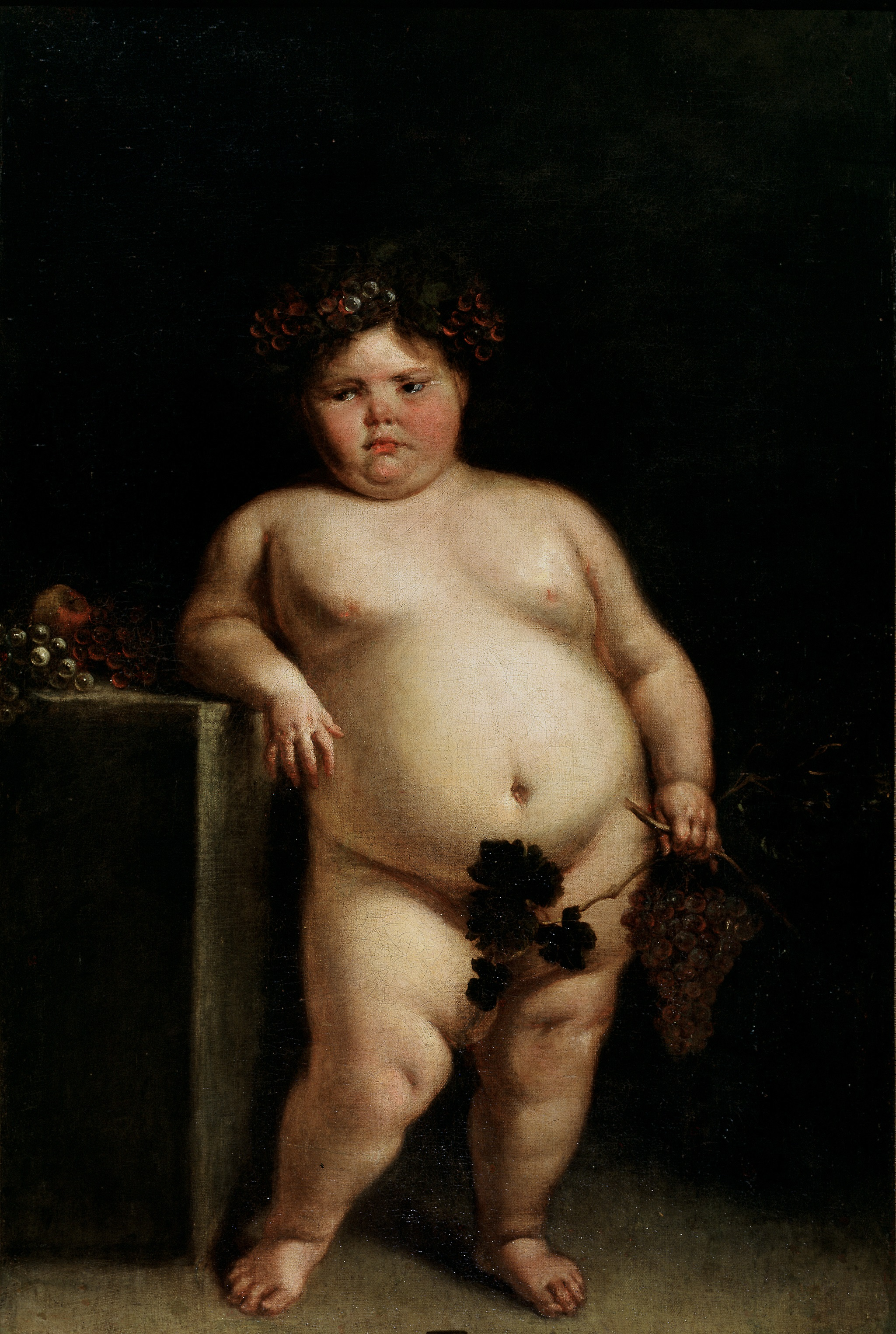
A 1680 painting by Juan Carreño de Miranda of a girl presumed to have Prader-Willi syndrome

Like many other medical conditions, obesity is the result of an interplay between environmental and genetic factors. Studies have identified variants in several genes that may contribute to weight gain and body fat distribution, although only in a few cases are genes the primary cause of obesity. Recent research indicates that environmental influences can lead to epigenetic modifications affecting gene expression related to obesity. These changes can alter metabolic processes and appetite regulation, contributing to obesity development.

Polymorphisms in various genes controlling appetite and metabolism predispose to obesity under certain dietary conditions. The percentage of obesity that can be attributed to genetics varies widely, depending on the population examined, from 6% to 85%, with the typical estimate at 50%. Twin studies have consistently shown that genetics account for 40% to 70% of the variation in body mass index (BMI) across individuals (Loos & Yeo, 2022). It is likely that in each person a number of genes contribute to the likelihood of developing obesity in small part, with each gene increasing or decreasing the odds marginally, and together determining how an individual responds to the environmental factors. As of 2006, more than 41 sites on the human genome have been linked to the development of obesity when a favorable environment is present. Some of these obesogenic (weight gain) or leptogenic (weight loss) genes may influence the obese individual's response to weight loss or weight management.

== Epigenetic influences and environmental interactions ==
Epigenetics plays a critical role in obesity susceptibility. Environmental exposures, such as poor maternal nutrition and exposure to endocrine-disrupting chemicals, can induce epigenetic modifications that alter gene expression without changing the DNA sequence. Research on epigenetic transgenerational inheritance suggests that environmental insults can reprogram the epigenome of germline cells (sperm and eggs), leading to obesity susceptibility in future generations.

Gene-environment interactions further complicate obesity risk. Certain genetic variants modify an individual's response to dietary intake, physical activity, and other lifestyle factors. For example, some individuals with specific FTO variants may have an increased appetite and lower satiety, predisposing them to higher caloric intake and weight gain. Conversely, adherence to a healthy diet can significantly reduce the genetic effects on body mass index (BMI), emphasizing the importance of lifestyle modifications even in genetically predisposed individuals.

== Specific genetic mechanisms ==
Although genetic deficiencies are currently considered rare, variations in these genes may predispose to common obesity. Many candidate genes are highly expressed in the central nervous system. The development of genetic tests, such as MyPhenome, enables the classification of obesity into specific subtypes based on genetic and phenotypic data. This stratification allows for personalized treatment approaches, improving the effectiveness of obesity interventions. Research has identified genes associated with obesity in both humans and animals. For example, the DENND1B gene has been linked to obesity in Labrador retrievers and humans, highlighting shared genetic factors influencing weight gain across species.

Several additional loci have been identified. Also, several quantitative trait loci for BMI have been identified.

Confirmed and hypothesized associations include:

Condition	OMIM	Locus	Notes
leptin deficiency	164160	7q31.3	
leptin receptor deficiency	601007	1p31	
Ghrelin	605353	3p25.3	
Ghrelin receptor	601898	3q26.31	
prohormone convertase-1 deficiency	600955	5q15-q21	
proopiomelanocortin deficiency	609734	2p23.3	
melanocortin-4 receptor polymorphism (MC4R)	155541	18q22	
BMIQ1		7q32.3	near D7S1804
BMIQ2		13q14	near D13S257
BMIQ3		6q23-q25	near D6S1009, GATA184A08, D6S2436, and D6S305
BMIQ4		11q24	near D11S1998, D11S4464, and D11S912
BMIQ5		16p13	near ATA41E04
BMIQ6		20pter-p11.2	near D20S482
INSIG2		2q14.1	
FTO		16q12.2	Adults who were homozygous for a particular FTO allele weighed about 3 kilograms more and had a 1.6-fold greater rate of obesity than those who had not inherited this trait. This association disappeared, though, when those with FTO polymorphisms participated in moderately intensive physical activity equivalent to three to four hours of brisk walking.
TMEM18		2p25.3	
GNPDA2		4p13	
NEGR1		1p31.1	
BDNF		11p13	
KCTD15		19q13.12	KCTD15 plays a role in transcriptional repression of AP-2α, which in turn, inhibits the activity of C/EBPα, an early inducer of adipogenesis.
KLF14		?	Although it does not play a role in the formation of fat itself, it does determine the location on the body where this fat is stored.
SH2B1		16p11.2	
MTCH2		11p11.2	
PCSK1		5q15-q21	
NPC1		18q11-q12	
LYPLAL1	616548	1q41	Disputed metabolic function of being either a lipase or a short-chain carboxylesterase.
CB_{1}	114610	6q15	
NPY5R	602001	4q32.2	

Some studies have focused upon inheritance patterns without focusing upon specific genes. One study found that 80% of the offspring of two obese parents were obese. In contrast, less than 10% of offspring of two parents who were of normal weight were obese.

The thrifty gene hypothesis postulates that due to dietary scarcity during human evolution people are prone to obesity. Their ability to take advantage of rare periods of abundance by storing energy as fat would be advantageous during times of varying food availability, and individuals with greater adipose reserves would more likely survive famine. This tendency to store fat, however, would be maladaptive in societies with stable food supplies. This is the presumed reason that Pima Native Americans, who evolved in a desert ecosystem, developed some of the highest rates of obesity when exposed to a Western lifestyle. Emerging research suggests that genetic factors may contribute to the common phenomenon of weight regain after weight loss, known as yo-yo dieting. These genetic influences can affect metabolic rate and appetite regulation, making sustained weight loss challenging for some individuals.

Numerous studies of laboratory rodents provide strong evidence that genetics play an important role in obesity.

The risk of obesity is determined by not only specific genotypes but also gene-gene interactions. However, there are still challenges associated with detecting gene-gene interactions for obesity.

=== Monogenic and syndromic obesity ===
Monogenic obesity results from single-gene mutations that disrupt the body's ability to regulate weight. These cases are rare but often lead to severe early-onset obesity. Studies have identified mutations in genes such as LEP (leptin), LEPR(leptin receptor), MC4R (melanocortin 4 receptor), and POMC (pro-opiomelanocortin), which play crucial roles in appetite regulation and energy balance. Syndromic obesity, a subset of monogenic obesity, is associated with additional developmental and endocrine abnormalities, as seen in conditions like Prader-Willi and Bardet-Biedl syndromes. Research suggests that these rare forms of genetic obesity may be more prevalent in severely obese children than previously estimated due to limited genetic screening availability.

=== Polygenic obesity ===
Polygenic obesity results from the combined effect of multiple genes that individually exert a small influence on body weight. Genome-wide association studies (GWAS) have identified numerous loci associated with obesity susceptibility, including the FTO(fat mass and obesity-associated) and MC4R genes. These genes are involved in processes such as appetite regulation, lipid metabolism, and energy homeostasis. Genetic variants in these loci interact with lifestyle factors, influencing an individual's likelihood of developing obesity.

=== Genes protective against obesity ===
There are also genes that can be protective against obesity. For instance, in GPR75 variants were identified as such alleles in ~640,000 sequenced exomes which may be relevant to e.g. therapeutic strategies against obesity. Other candidate anti-obesity-related genes include ALK, TBC1D1, and SRA1.

== Genetic syndromes ==
The term "non-syndromic obesity" is sometimes used to exclude these conditions. In people with early-onset severe obesity (defined by an onset before 10 years of age and body mass index over three standard deviations above normal), 7% harbor a single locus mutation.

== Current and emerging treatments for genetic obesity ==
The primary management approach for genetic obesity remains lifestyle interventions, including dietary modifications and physical activity. However, emerging therapies are being developed to target specific genetic pathways. For example, leptin replacement therapy has shown efficacy in treating individuals with leptin deficiency, while melanocortin receptor agonists are being investigated for their potential in addressing MC4R-related obesity. Ongoing clinical trials continue to explore novel pharmacological and gene-based therapies that may offer more effective treatment options for individuals with genetic obesity.

== See also ==
- New World syndrome
- Nutritional genomics
- Genetic causes of type 2 diabetes

Related:

- Human genetic variation
