= MTCH2 =

Protein-coding gene in the species Homo sapiens

Identifiers
- Aliases: MTCH2, MIMP, SLC25A50, HSPC032, mitochondrial carrier 2
- External IDs: OMIM: 613221; MGI: 1929260; GeneCards: MTCH2

Gene location (Human)
Chr.	Chromosome 11 (human)
Band	11p11.2	Start	47,617,315 bp
Band	11p11.2	End	47,642,607 bp

Gene location (Mouse)
Chr.	Chromosome 2 (mouse)
Band	2|2 E1	Start	90,677,499 bp
Band	2|2 E1	End	90,697,154 bp
RNA expression pattern
Bgee	Human / Mouse (ortholog); Top expressed in: left testis; right testis; mucosa of transverse colon; rectum; right lobe of liver; duodenum; stromal cell of endometrium; islet of Langerhans; gastrocnemius muscle; human kidney / Top expressed in: spermatid; spermatocyte; testicle; duodenum; jejunum; colon; right kidney; proximal tubule; ileum; white adipose tissue; More reference expression data
BioGPS	n/a
Orthologs
Databases	NCBI: entry; OMA: entry
Species	Human	Mouse
Entrez	23788	56428
Ensembl	ENSG00000109919; ENSG00000285121	ENSMUSG00000027282
UniProt	Q9Y6C9	Q791V5
RefSeq (mRNA)	NM_014342; NM_001317231; NM_001317232; NM_001317233	NM_019758; NM_001317241; NM_001317242; NM_001317243; NM_001317244
RefSeq (protein)	NP_001304160; NP_001304161; NP_001304162; NP_055157	NP_001304170; NP_001304171; NP_001304172; NP_001304173; NP_062732
Location (UCSC)	Chr 11: 47.62 – 47.64 Mb	Chr 2: 90.68 – 90.7 Mb
PubMed search
- Wikidata
View/Edit Human	View/Edit Mouse

Mitochondrial carrier homolog 2 also known as MTCH2 is a protein which in humans is encoded by the MTCH2 gene.

MTCH2 resides on the outer mitochondrial membrane where it co-localizes with the apoptotic Bcl-2 family protein BID.

== Clinical significance ==
MTCH2 assists in the recruitment of BID into the mitochondria during apoptosis.

Variants of the MTCH2 gene may be associated with obesity. MTCH2 represses mitochondrial metabolism such that a deficiency of MTCH2 increases energy consumption and production by mitochondria.

== See also ==
- Mitochondrial carrier
- Genetics of obesity
