= Diabetes in Indigenous Australians =

Diabetes, in particular, non-insulin-dependent diabetes, is prevalent in the Aboriginal and Torres Strait Islander populations of Australia. As many as 1 in 20 Australians are said to have diabetes. Aboriginal people are three times as likely to become diabetic in comparison to non-Aboriginal people. In contrast with type 1 diabetes, which is a predisposed autoimmune condition, type 2 diabetes or insulin-resistant diabetes, is a preventable disease, heavily influenced by a multitude of socioeconomic factors. People with the disease are consequently more susceptible to chronic health issues, including heart disease and kidney failure. Conclusively, this has contributed to the 17 year life expectancy gap between Aboriginal people and non-Aboriginal people alongside other health inequities between Aboriginal people and non-Aboriginal people.

== History ==
The history of Aboriginal Australians is said to have spanned some 60,000 years prior to colonization, yet they were first cited by Europeans in 1606. Further investigations of the land over the years leading to James Cook's arrival in 1769-70, suggested that the Aboriginal people were hunter-gatherers, who were described as "beasts who roamed the land". Fully utilising the resources at their disposal, the diet of the early Aboriginal people was predominantly made up of land animals, fish and shellfish, as well as birds and plant foods. (Note that some historians dispute this, such as Bill Gammage and Bruce Pascoe (in his book Dark Emu).

Post-colonisation, Aboriginal people experienced excessive disruptions to their socioeconomic circumstances, leading to a rapid decline in their health status. Forced to assimilate into a Eurocentric society, Aboriginal people abandoned their traditional way of living and reluctantly adopted those of the colony. Over time, this has seen the introduction of sugar and refined foods into the diet of Aboriginal Australians, initially to sever existing connections to the land. Aboriginal people have since viewed sugar as an important cultural food, associated with family identities and reinforcing connections. Subsequently, Aboriginal people have since become highly vulnerable to conditions such as diabetes.

== Causes ==
=== European influence ===
The prevalence of type 2 diabetes, obesity, and the corresponding diseases that are associated with these conditions, are often attributed to European influences at the time of colonisation. Sugar and refined foods were used at this time as a means of detaching Aboriginal people from the land and assimilating them into white society. Consequently, Aboriginal Australians have likened certain traditions and memories to the use of sugar. Thus, the ‘Westernisation’ of Aboriginal communities forced the neglect of a nutrient-dense diet and cemented a foundation for the development of type 2 diabetes.

=== Remoteness ===
The remoteness of Aboriginal communities and socioeconomic disparity have contributed to the prevalence of diabetes in Aboriginal Australians. Consequently, refined foods have seemingly replaced healthy alternatives, as communities are denied access to fresh and healthy foods due to limited resources. Many Aboriginal people live in poverty, with unemployment and dependence on welfare being common in many communities. Energy dense, filling foods, which are often high in fats and sugar, are more common in the diets of people living in poverty. There are direct correlations between the disparity of wealth, obesity, and subsequent morbidity. This is a main contributor to Aboriginal people and Torres Strait Islanders being 2-4 more times likely to have this condition.

=== Health inequalities ===
Health inequalities in society alongside a lack of education also contributes to the higher diagnosis of diabetes among Aboriginal and Torres Strait Islanders.

=== Unutilised resources ===
Similarly, Aboriginal people are recognised as not utilising the health resources at their disposal. Bush tucker, a dietary staple prior to European settlement that is low in natural sugars and free of refined sugars, is not being utilised even in remote communities due to the high dependence on Western diets. Australian Aboriginal people lack adequate diabetes education, including proper monitoring of glucose levels, making them more susceptible to diabetes-related problems.

=== Low birth weights ===
Aboriginal infants are also said to have relatively lower birth weights than normal, which can also contribute to early incidences of type 2 diabetes.

=== Lifestyle ===
Genetic predisposition is commonly found in early-onset diabetic patients. Diabetes is not a single gene disease, and rare gene variants and a common variant may be present in a single individual. Type 2 diabetes is also associated with obesity and other cardiovascular factors and lifestyle influences. Those with high blood pressure, a poor diet, insufficient physical activity, obesity, and in the case of Aboriginal Australians older than 35, are more susceptible to developing type 2 diabetes.

=== Pregnancy ===
Gestational diabetes, diabetes diagnosed during pregnancy, is highly common among Aboriginal Australians.

== Complications ==
Type 2 diabetes is a detrimental condition commonly affecting Aboriginal Australians. It is closely associated with obesity and is often a precursor for subsequent preventable diseases, including cardiovascular and renal disease. Hence, diabetes is a major cause of the premature mortality of many Aboriginal Australians.

Increased occurrence of renal complications among Aboriginal people is attributed to environmental and genetic factors, as well as poor monitoring of glucose levels. Low birth weight can cause lower renal volume, post-infectious renal damage, and other kidney conditions that are characteristically associated with chronic kidney disease and end stage kidney failure. Consequently, Australian Aboriginal people are 8 times more likely to experience kidney failure than non-Aboriginal Australians.

Cardiovascular disease is the single greatest contributor to the disparity in life expectancy between Aboriginal and non-Aboriginal Australians. Obesity and increased waist circumference is an important risk factor, along with other modifiable influences including smoking, high blood pressure, high cholesterol levels, low levels of physical activity. All of these influences contribute to the incidence of diabetes and consequently, cardiovascular disease. Additionally, gestational diabetes can cause harm to pregnant women and also leads to complications in the fetus.

The prevalence of type 2 diabetes in Aboriginal Australians can lead to retinopathy, whereby blood vessels in the eye are damaged as a direct result of this condition. Peripheral neuropathy is also common in diabetes patients and in some cases can lead to chronic foot problems and even amputations.

== Prevention ==
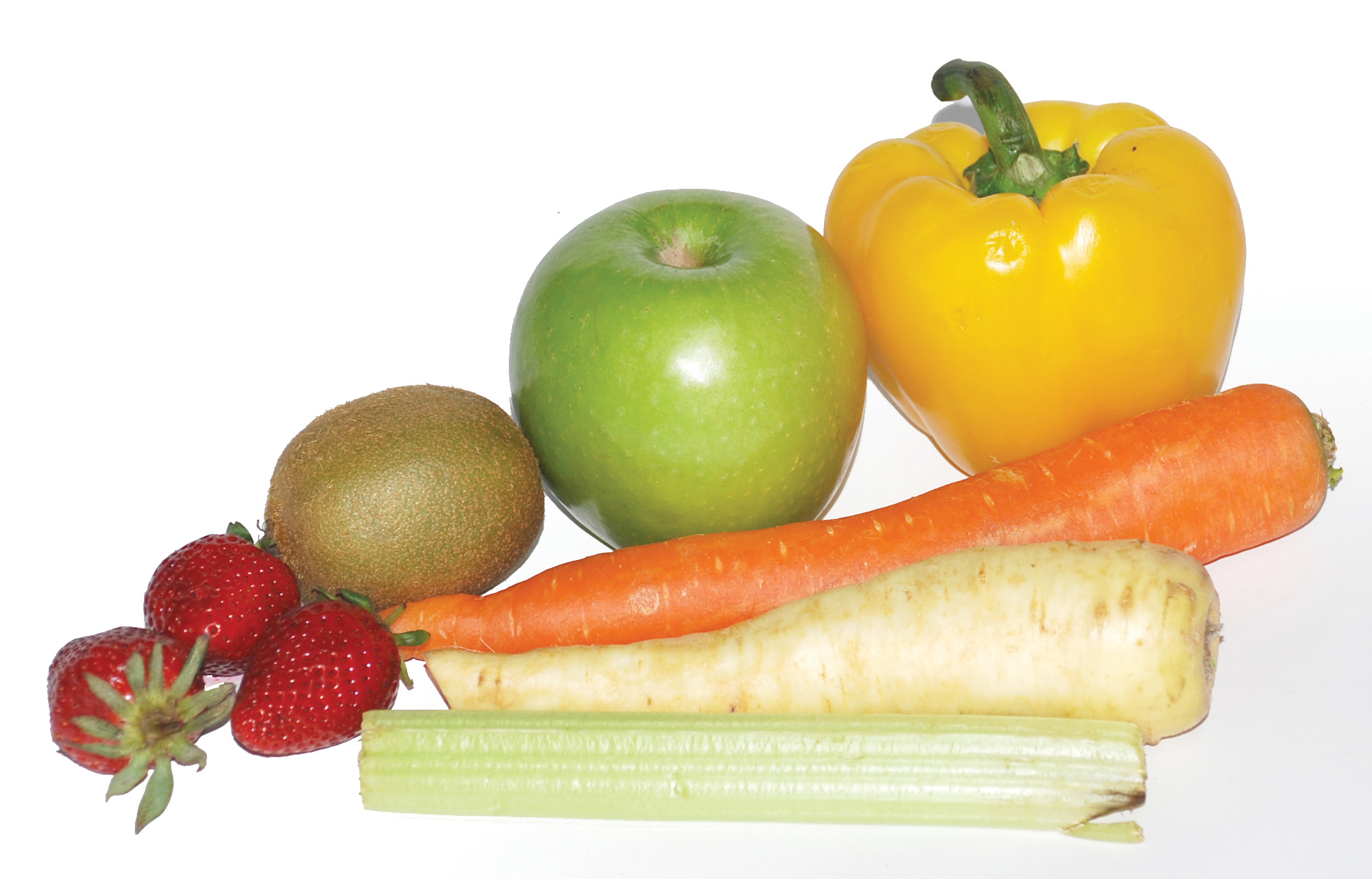

Health issues affecting Aboriginal Australians, including the incidence of type 2 diabetes, are often attributed to disparities in socioeconomic status. Often, the greater the social and economic disadvantage, the greater the occurrence of diabetes and other associated conditions. Improvements in the socioeconomic status of Aboriginal Australians and decreases in health inequities are instrumental if the incidence of diabetes and associated conditions are to be reduced.

Early detection programs and diabetes screenings are essential in reducing the frequency of diabetes and its long-term effects. Additionally, regular weight assessments should be done. Promotion of healthy eating and physical activity, smoking cessation and the safe consumption of alcohol are also vital to reduce and prevent type 2 diabetes. The Australian government has addressed the need for such intervention by implementing the National Prevention of Type 2 Diabetes program. Arguably, such programs need to be supported by efforts to provide greater employment and educational opportunities for Aboriginal Australians and health programs tailored to their favoured holistic approach to health and wellbeing.

== Statistics ==
One in 20 Australian adults had diabetes in 2011–2012.

Aboriginal people and Torres Strait Islander people are 2–4 times more likely to develop diabetes than their non-Indigenous counterparts.

Diabetes among Aboriginal people is apparent as early as 25 years of age. Approximately 18% of Aboriginal and Torres Strait Islanders over the age of 25 report having diabetes or high blood sugar levels. Rates of diabetes range from 5% for those in the 25-34 age bracket to 39% for those aged 55 years and over.

In 2012–2013, approximately 8% of Aboriginal and Torres Strait Islanders reported that they had diabetes or high blood sugar levels. Females were more likely than men to have diabetes, with 10% claiming to be diabetic, in comparison to 7% of males.
