= GNPDA2 =

Protein-coding gene in the species Homo sapiens

Identifiers
- Aliases: GNPDA2, GNP2, SB52, glucosamine-6-phosphate deaminase 2
- External IDs: OMIM: 613222; MGI: 1915230; HomoloGene: 12381; GeneCards: GNPDA2; OMA:GNPDA2 - orthologs

Gene location (Human)
Chr.	Chromosome 4 (human)
Band	4p12	Start	44,682,200 bp
Band	4p12	End	44,726,588 bp

Gene location (Mouse)
Chr.	Chromosome 5 (mouse)
Band	5|5 C3.1	Start	69,730,451 bp
Band	5|5 C3.1	End	69,749,683 bp
RNA expression pattern
Bgee	Human / Mouse (ortholog); Top expressed in: secondary oocyte; Achilles tendon; ventricular zone; islet of Langerhans; ganglionic eminence; smooth muscle tissue; cerebellar hemisphere; right hemisphere of cerebellum; Brodmann area 9; Descending thoracic aorta / Top expressed in: spermatid; olfactory epithelium; zygote; secondary oocyte; lumbar spinal ganglion; atrioventricular valve; primary oocyte; lateral septal nucleus; ventromedial nucleus; seminiferous tubule; More reference expression data
BioGPS	n/a
Gene ontology
Molecular function	protein binding; hydrolase activity; glucosamine-6-phosphate deaminase activity; identical protein binding
Cellular component	nucleus; cytosol; cytoplasm
Biological process	N-acetylglucosamine metabolic process; glucosamine catabolic process; carbohydrate metabolic process; N-acetylglucosamine catabolic process; UDP-N-acetylglucosamine biosynthetic process; N-acetylneuraminate catabolic process
Sources:Amigo / QuickGO
Orthologs
Species	Human	Mouse
Entrez	132789	67980
Ensembl	ENSG00000163281	ENSMUSG00000029209
UniProt	Q8TDQ7	Q9CRC9
RefSeq (mRNA)	NM_001270880; NM_001270881; NM_138335	NM_001038015; NM_027681; NM_001347363; NM_001359239
RefSeq (protein)	NP_001257809; NP_001257810; NP_612208	NP_001033104; NP_001334292; NP_001346168
Location (UCSC)	Chr 4: 44.68 – 44.73 Mb	Chr 5: 69.73 – 69.75 Mb
PubMed search
- Wikidata
View/Edit Human	View/Edit Mouse

Glucosamine-6-phosphate deaminase 2 also known as GNPDA2 is an enzyme that in humans is encoded by the GNPDA2 gene.

== Clinical significance ==
Variants of the GNPDA2 gene may be associated with obesity.
