= NEGR1 =

Protein found in humans

Identifiers
- Aliases: NEGR1, DMML2433, IGLON4, KILON, Ntra, neuronal growth regulator 1
- External IDs: OMIM: 613173; MGI: 2444846; GeneCards: NEGR1

Gene location (Human)
Chr.	Chromosome 1 (human)
Band	1p31.1	Start	71,395,943 bp
Band	1p31.1	End	72,282,539 bp

Gene location (Mouse)
Chr.	Chromosome 3 (mouse)
Band	3|3 H4	Start	156,267,431 bp
Band	3|3 H4	End	157,022,082 bp
RNA expression pattern
Bgee	Human / Mouse (ortholog); Top expressed in: Brodmann area 46; Brodmann area 23; occipital lobe; primary visual cortex; superior frontal gyrus; spinal ganglia; superficial temporal artery; parietal lobe; middle temporal gyrus; Achilles tendon / Top expressed in: piriform cortex; anterior amygdaloid area; cerebellar vermis; subiculum; lobe of cerebellum; ventromedial nucleus; olfactory tubercle; inferior colliculi; lateral hypothalamus; nucleus accumbens; More reference expression data
BioGPS	n/a
Gene ontology
Molecular function	protein binding
Cellular component	anchored component of membrane; membrane; extracellular region; plasma membrane
Biological process	cell adhesion; locomotory behavior; feeding behavior; positive regulation of neuron projection development; cell-cell adhesion
Sources:Amigo / QuickGO
Orthologs
Databases	NCBI: entry; OMA: entry
Species	Human	Mouse
Entrez	257194	320840
Ensembl	ENSG00000172260	ENSMUSG00000040037
UniProt	Q7Z3B1	Q80Z24
RefSeq (mRNA)	NM_173808	NM_001039094; NM_177274
RefSeq (protein)	NP_776169	NP_001034183; NP_796248
Location (UCSC)	Chr 1: 71.4 – 72.28 Mb	Chr 3: 156.27 – 157.02 Mb
PubMed search
- Wikidata
View/Edit Human	View/Edit Mouse

Neuronal growth regulator 1 also known as NEGR1 is a protein which in humans is encoded by the NEGR1 gene.

== Clinical significance ==
Variants of the NEGR1 gene may be associated with obesity and major depression.
