= TMEM18 =

Protein-coding gene in the species Homo sapiens

Identifiers
- Aliases: TMEM18, transmembrane protein 18, lncND
- External IDs: OMIM: 613220; MGI: 2387176; HomoloGene: 138333; GeneCards: TMEM18; OMA:TMEM18 - orthologs

Gene location (Human)
Chr.	Chromosome 2 (human)
Band	2p25.3	Start	663,877 bp
Band	2p25.3	End	677,406 bp

Gene location (Mouse)
Chr.	Chromosome 12 (mouse)
Band	12|12 A2	Start	30,634,425 bp
Band	12|12 A2	End	30,641,214 bp
RNA expression pattern
Bgee	Human / Mouse (ortholog); Top expressed in: Achilles tendon; sural nerve; endothelial cell; germinal epithelium; left ovary; tendon of biceps brachii; right ovary; pancreatic epithelial cell; parietal pleura; gonad / Top expressed in: spermatocyte; otolith organ; utricle; sciatic nerve; ciliary body; hand; iris; retinal pigment epithelium; substantia nigra; medullary collecting duct; More reference expression data
BioGPS	n/a
Gene ontology
Molecular function	DNA binding
Cellular component	cytoplasm; integral component of membrane; nuclear membrane; membrane; nucleus
Biological process	cell migration; transcription, DNA-templated
Sources:Amigo / QuickGO
Orthologs
Species	Human	Mouse
Entrez	129787	211986
Ensembl	ENSG00000151353	ENSMUSG00000043061
UniProt	Q96B42	Q3TUD9
RefSeq (mRNA)	NM_152834; NM_001352680; NM_001352681	NM_172049
RefSeq (protein)	NP_690047; NP_001339609; NP_001339610	NP_742046
Location (UCSC)	Chr 2: 0.66 – 0.68 Mb	Chr 12: 30.63 – 30.64 Mb
PubMed search
- Wikidata
View/Edit Human	View/Edit Mouse

Transmembrane protein 18, also known as TMEM18, is a protein which in humans is encoded by the TMEM18 gene.

== Function ==
TMEM18 seems to affect energy levels through insulin and glucagon signaling, and in flies, its downregulation induces a metabolic state resembling type-II diabetes

Overexpression of the TMEM18 protein increases the migration capacity of neural stem cells while inactivation of TMEM18 results in almost complete loss of migration activity.

The TMEM18 gene is ubiquitously expressed in both mammalian and fly tissues, which suggests a basic cellular function. In the mouse brain, it is found in the majority of all cells, but is more abundant in neurons than other cell types.

== Clinical significance ==
Genetic variants in the proximity of the TMEM18 gene are associated with obesity, insulin levels, and blood sugar levels

== Evolutionary history ==
The TMEM18 gene has a long evolutionary history as it is present in both plants and animals. The TMEM18 protein's amino acid sequence is well conserved, which suggests that it has retained its function since the divergence of human and plants. The gene seems to have been lost in two separate lineages, but is not found duplicated in any analyzed genomes. Hence, it is not essential for eukaryotic organisms, but there appears to be selection against multiple copies of the TMEM18 gene.
