= Chittaranjan Yajnik =

Indian scientist

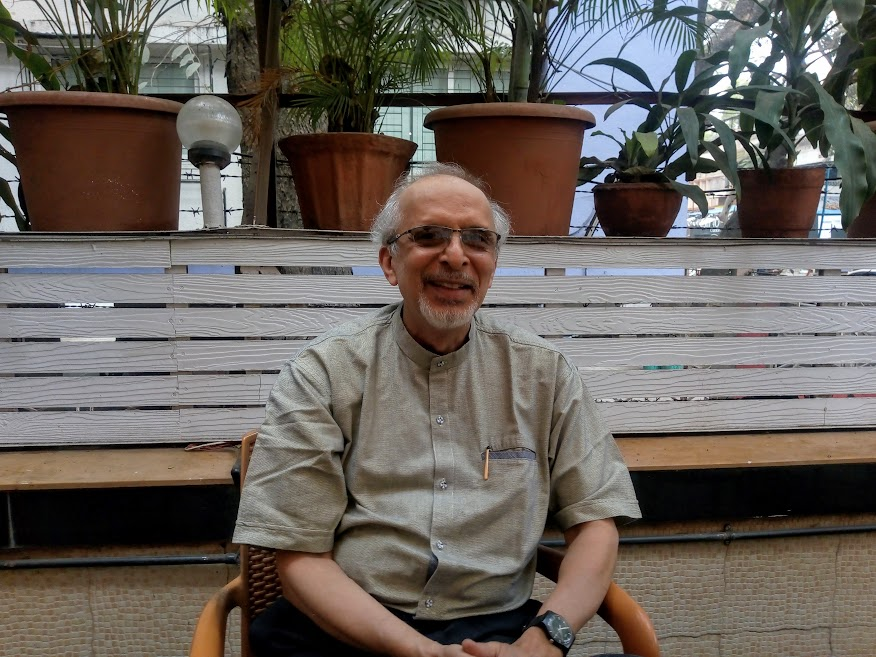
- Yajnik in 2020
- Occupation: Medical scientist

Chittaranjan Yajnik is a medical scientist from Pune, India who is a specialist in diabetes research and maternal nutrition.

Yajnik is known for his work on the topic of the ‘thin-fat’ Indian, which explains that though not obese by international criteria Indians are adipose (high body fat percent). He has worked in the field of intrauterine programming of diabetes and was successful in showing possible role of maternal micronutrient nutrition in its aetiology.

In 2024, he was featured among the top 2% of researchers worldwide, Stanford’s 2024 top 2% list, released in collaboration with Elsevier.
