= John Speakman =

British biologist and academic (born 1958)

John Speakman FRS FRSE FRSB FRSA FMedSci FRSS
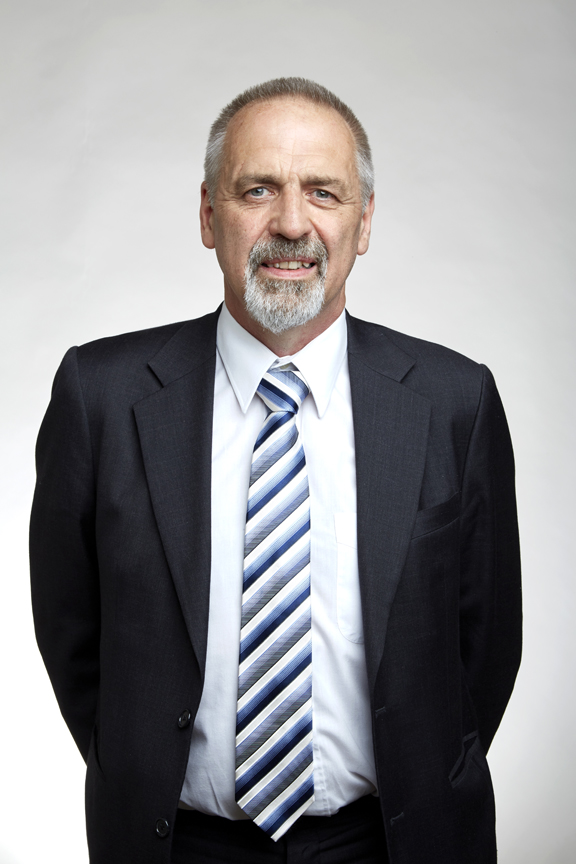
- Speakman in 2018
- Born: John Roger Speakman; November 1958 (age 67)
- Education: Leigh Grammar School, University of Stirling
- Spouse: Mary Speakman
- Awards: Royal Society Wolfson Research Merit Award (2016)
- Scientific career
- Fields: Physiological ecology; Energetics; Obesity; Aging; Lactation
- Workplaces: University of Aberdeen; Chinese Academy of Sciences
- Thesis: The energetics of foraging in wading birds (Charadrii) (1984)
- Doctoral advisor: David Bryant
- Website: www.abdn.ac.uk/energetics-research/speakman/

John Roger Speakman (born 1958) is a British biologist working at the University of Aberdeen, Institute of Biological and Environmental Sciences, for which he was Director from 2007 to 2011. He leads the University's Energetics Research Group, which uses doubly labeled water (DLW) to investigate energy expenditure and balance in animals. Between 2011-2020, he was a '1000 talents' Professor at the Institute of Genetics and Developmental Biology, Chinese Academy of Sciences, in Beijing, China, where he ran the molecular energetics group. In 2020 he moved to the Shenzhen Institutes of Advanced Technology, Chinese Academy of Sciences in Shenzhen, China where he works at the Center for Energy Metabolism and Reproduction and Head of the Shenzhen Key laboratory of Metabolic Health.

== Education ==
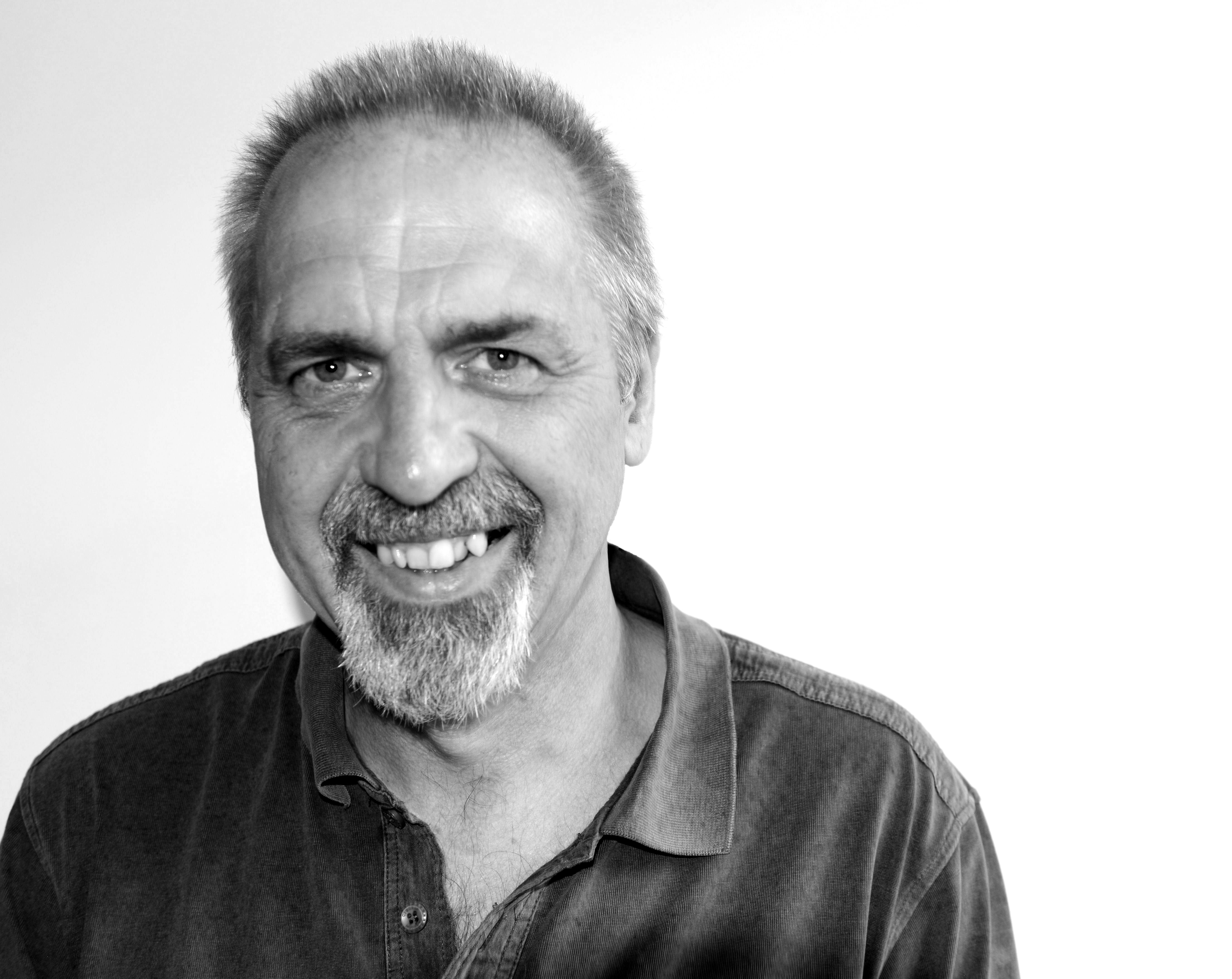
Speakman in 2015

Speakman was educated at Leigh Grammar School, near Manchester, and then went to the University of Stirling where he was awarded a BSc in Biology and Psychology in 1980 and a PhD in 1984 for research on the energetics of foraging in wading birds. He was subsequently awarded Doctor of Science (DSc) degrees by both the University of Aberdeen in 1996 and University of Stirling in 2009. in 2017 he obtained a BSc in Maths and Statistics from the Open University.

== Career and research ==
Speakman's work focuses on the causes and consequences of variation in energy balance, and in particular the factors that limit expenditure, the genetic and environmental drivers of obesity and the energetic contribution to ageing. He is an internationally recognised expert in the use of isotope methodologies to measure energy demands and has used these methods on a wide range of wild animals, model species and humans.

During the mid-1980s and early 1990s, Speakman contributed to the development of the DLW method, culminating in the book Doubly labelled water: theory and practice, published in 1997. Since 2018 he has been the chairman of the International Atomic Energy Agency doubly-labelled water database management committee, which manages a database of over 7500 measurements of human subjects made using the DLW method. A paper by Pontzer, Yamada and colleagues utilising this database, on which Speakman was a co-corresponding author, summarised the metabolic rates of humans between 8 days and 96 years old, was published in Science in August 2021.

Speakman's work on obesity criticises a long-established theory for obesity known as the thrifty gene hypothesis. His alternative hypothesis proposes that the modern distribution of obese phenotypes arose via the release from predation and random genetic drift: the drifty gene hypothesis. This idea is controversial and has been criticised by others who support the original thrifty gene hypothesis. A test of the ideas involved searching for signatures of selection at loci linked to body mass index and showed consistent with the ‘drifty’ but not ‘thrifty’ gene ideas there was no evidence of strong selection at these loci. Since 2018 he has published a series of studies of responses of mice to different diets, disputing the carbohydrate insulin model of obesity, This work culminated in a perspective article in Science with co-author Kevin D. Hall (in 2021) highlighting the inadequacies of the carbohydrate insulin model. In 2023 he led a paper using data from the DLW database which showed total energy expenditure has declined over the last 35 years surprisingly this was traced down to a reduction in basal metabolic rate rather than a decline in physical activity expenditure, which has actually increased.

Speakman's group was the first to link genetic variation to differences in food consumption in humans by examining polymorphic variation in the fat mass and obesity associated FTO gene.

With Aberdeen colleague Ela Krol, among others, he has published a series of over 30 papers in the Journal of Experimental Biology, which culminated in a novel hypothesis that animal energy expenditure is limited by the capacity to dissipate body heat. This idea – the "heat dissipation limit hypothesis" (HDL) was published by Speakman and Krol in the Journal of Animal Ecology in 2010. The idea is claimed to have wide implications for our understanding of many aspects of ecophysiology and ecology – such as limits on range distributions, maximum possible sizes of endothermic animals e.g. dinosaurs, Bergmann's rule, effects of climate change etc. The idea shifts the fundamental locus of control over energy expenditure from extrinsic factors outside the animal (e.g. food supply, fractal supply system, uptake capacity), to intrinsic factors inside an animal (heat dissipation capacity). An independent review of studies of energy expenditure concluded that the HDL hypothesis provided a better explanation of the patterns of energy expenditure in endotherms than does the metabolic theory of ecology.

Speakman writes a monthly popular science column for the magazine ‘Newton’ (translated into Chinese by an ex-student Lina Zhang) and has also published three popular science books consisting of the compiled English versions of these articles.

Speakman's publications can be found at Google Scholar, Europe PubMed Central, Scopus, The University of Aberdeen, ResearchGate, and academia.edu. Speakman was co-author with Patrick Butler, Anne Brown and George Stevenson of the textbook Animal Physiology published by Oxford University Press in 2020.

=== Awards and honours ===
- 2010 Bing Zhi forum Professor of the Chinese Academy of Sciences Institute of Zoology in Beijing
- 2014 the Irving-Scholander Prize lecture at the University of Fairbanks, Alaska
- 2015 first Briton to be awarded the Chinese Academy of Sciences medal for International cooperation.
- 2016 Royal Society Wolfson Research Merit Award from the Royal Society of London.
- 2020 Elected foreign member of the US National Academy of Sciences. He is one of only 28 scientists in the world to be simultaneously a fellow of the UK, US and Chinese National academies.
