= Zinc transporter 8 =

Protein found in humans

SLC30A8

Identifiers
- Aliases: SLC30A8, ZNT8, ZnT-8, solute carrier family 30 member 8
- External IDs: OMIM: 611145; MGI: 2442682; GeneCards: SLC30A8

Gene location (Human)
| Chr. | Chromosome 8 (human) |
| Band | 8q24.11 | Start | 116,950,273 bp |
| Band | 8q24.11 | End | 117,176,714 bp |

Gene location (Mouse)
| Chr. | Chromosome 15 (mouse) |
| Band | 15|15 C | Start | 52,158,949 bp |
| Band | 15|15 C | End | 52,199,194 bp |
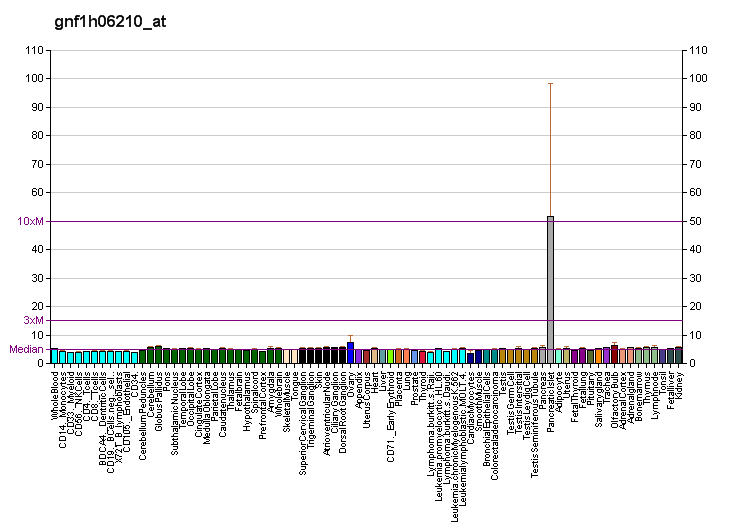
RNA expression pattern
| Bgee | Human / Mouse (ortholog); Top expressed in: islet of Langerhans; pancreatic epithelial cell; testicle; body of pancreas; tibialis anterior muscle; mucosa of ileum; gonad; right testis; left testis; deltoid muscle / Top expressed in: islet of Langerhans; embryo; right kidney; foregut; stomach; More reference expression data |
| BioGPS | More reference expression data |
Gene ontology
| Molecular function | protein homodimerization activity; cation transmembrane transporter activity; zinc ion binding; protein binding; zinc ion transmembrane transporter activity |
| Cellular component | integral component of membrane; Golgi apparatus; secretory granule membrane; membrane; plasma membrane; transport vesicle membrane; secretory granule; cytoplasmic vesicle |
| Biological process | response to interleukin-1; response to interferon-gamma; glucose homeostasis; regulation of vesicle-mediated transport; zinc ion transport; response to zinc ion; cation transport; insulin secretion; ion transport; response to glucose; cation transmembrane transport; sequestering of zinc ion; cellular zinc ion homeostasis; regulation of sequestering of zinc ion; positive regulation of insulin secretion; zinc ion transmembrane transport; transmembrane transport |
Sources:Amigo / QuickGO
Orthologs
| Databases | NCBI: entry; OMA: entry |
| Species | Human | Mouse |
| Entrez | 169026 | 239436 |
| Ensembl | ENSG00000164756 | ENSMUSG00000022315 |
| UniProt | Q8IWU4 | Q8BGG0 |
| RefSeq (mRNA) | NM_001172811; NM_001172813; NM_001172814; NM_001172815; NM_173851 | NM_172816 |
| RefSeq (protein) | NP_001166282; NP_001166284; NP_001166285; NP_001166286; NP_776250 | NP_766404 |
| Location (UCSC) | Chr 8: 116.95 – 117.18 Mb | Chr 15: 52.16 – 52.2 Mb |
| PubMed search |
- Wikidata
| View/Edit Human | View/Edit Mouse |

Zinc transporter 8 (ZNT8) is a protein that in humans is encoded by the SLC30A8 gene. ZNT8 is a zinc transporter related to insulin secretion in humans. In particular, ZNT8 is critical for the accumulation of zinc into beta cell secretory granules and the maintenance of stored insulin as tightly packaged hexamers. Certain alleles of the SLC30A8 gene may increase the risk for developing type 2 diabetes, but a loss-of-function mutation appears to greatly reduce the risk of diabetes.

== Clinical significance ==
=== Association with type 2 diabetes (T2D) ===
Twelve rare variants in SLC30A8 have been identified through the sequencing or genotyping of approximately 150,000 individuals from 5 different ancestry groups. SLC30A8 contains a common variant (p.Trp325Arg), which is associated with T2D risk and levels of glucose and proinsulin. Individuals carrying protein-truncating variants collectively had 65% reduced risk of T2D. Additionally, non-diabetic individuals from Iceland harboring a frameshift variant p. Lys34Serfs*50 demonstrated reduced glucose levels. Earlier functional studies of SLC30A8 suggested that reduced zinc transport increased T2D risk. Conversely, loss-of-function mutations in humans indicate that SLC30A8 haploinsufficiency protects against T2D. Therefore, ZnT8 inhibition can serve as a therapeutic strategy in preventing T2D.

== See also ==
- Solute carrier family
