= ZBED3 =

Protein-coding gene in the species Homo sapiens

Identifiers
- Aliases: ZBED3, zinc finger BED-type containing 3
- External IDs: OMIM: 615250; MGI: 1919364; GeneCards: ZBED3

Gene location (Human)
Chr.	Chromosome 5 (human)
Band	5q13.3	Start	77,072,072 bp
Band	5q13.3	End	77,087,285 bp

Gene location (Mouse)
Chr.	Chromosome 13 (mouse)
Band	13|13 D1	Start	95,460,120 bp
Band	13|13 D1	End	95,474,349 bp
RNA expression pattern
Bgee	Human / Mouse (ortholog); Top expressed in: secondary oocyte; mucosa of ileum; retinal pigment epithelium; smooth muscle tissue; left lobe of thyroid gland; subcutaneous adipose tissue; right lobe of thyroid gland; parotid gland; body of uterus; body of pancreas / Top expressed in: secondary oocyte; zygote; primary oocyte; genital tubercle; tail of embryo; ventricular zone; yolk sac; right kidney; choroid plexus of fourth ventricle; lactiferous gland; More reference expression data
BioGPS	n/a
Gene ontology
Molecular function	DNA binding; metal ion binding; DNA-binding transcription factor activity, RNA polymerase II-specific
Cellular component	cytoplasm; membrane; cytosol
Biological process	positive regulation of canonical Wnt signaling pathway; negative regulation of protein phosphorylation; protein stabilization; Wnt signaling pathway; positive regulation of transcription by RNA polymerase II
Sources:Amigo / QuickGO
Orthologs
Databases	NCBI: entry; OMA: entry
Species	Human	Mouse
Entrez	84327	72114
Ensembl	ENSG00000132846	ENSMUSG00000041995
UniProt	Q96IU2	Q9D0L1
RefSeq (mRNA)	NM_032367; NM_001329564	NM_028106; NM_001302538; NM_001302539
RefSeq (protein)	NP_001316493; NP_115743	NP_001289467; NP_001289468; NP_082382
Location (UCSC)	Chr 5: 77.07 – 77.09 Mb	Chr 13: 95.46 – 95.47 Mb
PubMed search
- Wikidata
View/Edit Human	View/Edit Mouse

Zinc finger BED domain-containing protein 3 also known as axin-interacting protein is a protein in humans that is encoded by the ZBED3 gene.

== Function ==
ZBED3 (Zinc finger BED-type containing 3) is a protein-coding gene arising from hAT DNA transposons. It encodes a 234-amino acid regulatory protein characterized by the presence of a BED-type zinc finger domain, which enables interactions with both DNA and protein partners. ZBED3 is thought to function as a positive regulator of the Wnt/β-catenin signaling pathway, an essential pathway involved in embryonic development and adult stem cell renewal. This regulatory role is mediated through its interaction with the Axin–glycogen synthase kinase 3 beta (GSK3β) complex. By binding to and inhibiting this complex, ZBED3 promotes stabilization of β-catenin, enhancing downstream Wnt signaling activity.

The protein contains a conserved PPPPSPT motif that facilitates binding to the Axin–GSK3β complex. Mutations affecting key amino acid residues within this motif have been shown to impair ZBED3’s binding capacity. Experimental knockdown of ZBED3 using RNA interference results in reduced β-catenin levels, potentially affecting signaling pathways.

== Clinical significance ==
Altered expression of ZBED3 has been associated with several pathological conditions. Reduced expression has been observed kidney renal cell carcinoma, while increased expression has been linked to insulin resistance, hyperglycemia, and lung cancer.
