= Nutritional gatekeeper =

Person in a household who purchases and prepares food

Nutritional gatekeeper has been used to refer to the person in a household who typically makes the purchasing and preparation decisions related to food. Nutritional gatekeepers can be a parent, grandparent, sibling, or caregiver.

== History ==
The concept of the nutritional gatekeeper was first suggested by Kurt Lewin in 1943.

Based on Lewin’s research, food reaches the household through "channels" such as grocery store, the garden, and the refrigerator. The selection of the channels and the food that passes through them is under control of the gatekeeper.

For sixty-five years since Lewin’s work, many dietetics and nutrition textbooks have referred, in the discussions of children’s and adolescents’ dietary habits, to the gatekeeper role played by women.

== Roles ==
Gatekeeper research starting in the 1940s suggests that the cooks are also responsible for nutrition. Cooking family dinners can expand the nutritional gatekeeper's influence. Eating family dinner has been associated with healthful dietary patterns, better fruit and vegetable intake, lower intake of fried food and soda.

A home’s nutritional gatekeeper usually has the biggest food influence in the nutrition life of most people. They are the biggest food influence in the lives of their children as well as in the life of their spouse or partner. They also influence the restaurant orders of their family by what they recommend or order themselves.

Greater numbers of children are relying on caregivers to provide a significant portion of their nutritional needs or act as nutritional gatekeepers. Currently, child care in the United States is varied – child care homes (both regulated and unregulated) – and other placement such as care in the child’s home by a relative or other caregiver.

Providing healthful meals and snacks to children during the day (and sometimes the early evening as well) in a pleasant eating environment is a major responsibility for the child care facility. In other words, the child care facility have joined the family as the nutritional gatekeepers’. As stated in Briley, Mcbride, & Roberts-Gray, 1997, Caregivers are being asked to take the role of the nutritional gatekeeper for children.
