= Mir-375 =

Pancreas-specific microRNA

mir-375
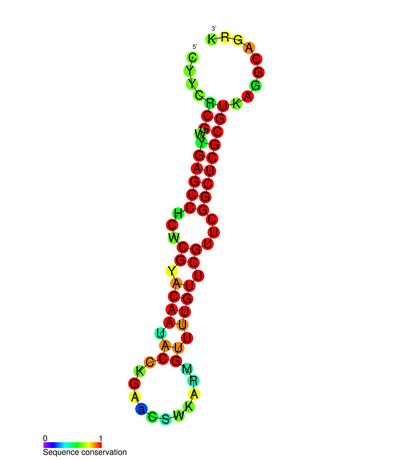
- Conserved secondary structure of mir-375

Identifiers
- Symbol: mir-375
- Rfam: RF00700
- miRBase family: MIPF0000114

Other data
- RNA type: microRNA
- Domain: Eukaryota;
- PDB structures: PDBe

Mir-375

Identifiers
- Aliases: MIR375, MIRN375, hsa-mir-375, miRNA375, mir-375, microRNA 375
- External IDs: OMIM: 611173; GeneCards: MIR375

Gene location (Human)
Chr.	Chromosome 2 (human)
Band	2q35	Start	219,001,645 bp
Band	2q35	End	219,001,708 bp
RNA expression pattern
Bgee	Human / Mouse (ortholog); Top expressed in: islet of Langerhans; blood; right frontal lobe; monocyte; placenta; stomach; muscle layer of sigmoid colon; transverse colon; right lobe of thyroid gland; minor salivary glands / n/a; More reference expression data
BioGPS	n/a
Orthologs
Databases	NCBI: entry; OMA: entry
Species	Human	Mouse
Entrez	494324	n/a
Ensembl	ENSG00000198973	n/a
UniProt	n a	n/a
RefSeq (mRNA)	n/a	n/a
RefSeq (protein)	n/a	n/a
Location (UCSC)	Chr 2: 219 – 219 Mb	n/a
PubMed search		n/a
- Wikidata
View/Edit Human

The miR-375 microRNA (miRNA) is a short RNA molecule located on human chromosome 2 in between the CRYBA2 and CCDC108 genes. miRNAs are small (18–25 nucleotides), non-coding RNAs that regulate genes post-transcriptionally by inhibiting translation and/or causing mRNA degradation. miR-375 is specifically expressed in the pancreatic islets, brain and spinal cord. Genetic manipulation of miR-375 levels can decrease cancer development and autoimmunity in affected cell types.

== Roles in development ==
=== Diabetes ===
miR-375 plays a critical role in diabetes by regulating the expression of related genes involved in pancreatic islet formation, pancreatic development, and β-cell secretion. These processes are related to diabetes because pancreatic islets contain β-cells that produce insulin, a hormone that regulates blood sugar. A person with diabetes will have high blood sugar either because their cells are not responding to insulin or because their pancreatic beta cells are not producing enough of it. In patients with type 2 diabetes, β-cell mass is reduced by up to 60% when compared to healthy individuals. Similarly, there is a decrease in β-cell mass per pancreatic area when miR-375 is knocked out in mice. In addition, miR-375 shows elevated expression levels during pancreatic development, which coincide with higher insulin expression and β-cell proliferation. Thus, evidence suggests that miR-375 is important for normal pancreatic islet formation and insulin secretion from β-cells. Because of the role miR-375 plays in regulating processes essential for healthy sugar metabolism, it may be a potential target for treating diabetes.

Diabetes is currently managed with exogenous insulin and islet cell transplantation. However, these treatments fall short in their attempts to reestablish the natural regulation of blood sugar and are limited by the scarcity of donor tissue, respectively. To address these concerns, scientists have begun investigating the potential of human embryonic stem cells (hESCs), which are cells that can develop into many adult cell types including pancreatic β-cells. As such, hESCs have the potential to provide a limitless source of insulin-producing β-cells. However, creating mature β-cells from hESCs has proved challenging for researchers because the hESC-derived cells often secreted other hormones in addition to insulin. miR-375 may provide a new way to mature hESCs into β-cells because of its high expressivity in β-cells and its function in insulin release. Therefore, miR-375 is a promising target for the treatment of diabetes.

== Roles in cancer ==
Affected organ	Proposed mechanisms/applications
Liver	In cancerous liver cells, known as hepatocellular carcinomas (HCC), miR-375 acts as a tumour suppressor. This was evidenced by a decrease in the rate of uncontrolled cell division through the inhibition of a well-known oncogene, AEG-1, in response to miR-375 overexpression. Recent studies show that when miR-375 is introduced into HCC cell lines, there is a reduction in cell proliferation, motility, and migration, as well as an increase in apoptosis in vitro. In vivo studies in mouse models of HCC also show reduced tumour growth with no apparent side effects. These results support potential strategies to increase miR-375 levels in HCCs to prevent metastasis.
Esophagus	miR-375 overexpression inhibits tumour growth and metastasis of esophageal cancer cells by inhibiting insulin-like growth factor 1 receptor and proteins involved in the PI3K/Akt signalling pathway. The PI3K/Akt signalling pathway promotes aerobic glycolysis, which is a hallmark of rapidly dividing cancer cells. Hence, a potential strategy for inhibiting proliferation in esophageal cancer cells would be to increase intracellular miR-375 levels.
Skin	Increased expression of miR-375 in Merkel cell carcinomas (MCC) is used as a marker to differentiate MCC from other common skin cancers.

== Immunity ==
miR-375 is involved in many autoimmune diseases, such as inflammatory bowel diseases (IBD) and type 1 diabetes mellitus (T1DM). For instance, miR-375 can be used as a factor to distinguish between the different types of IBD (e.g. Crohn's disease vs ulcerative colitis). In patients with T1DM, miR-375 dysregulation was observed in a number of tissues that were directly linked to the development of the disease. Furthermore, miR-375 is involved in the molecular aspects of immunity as miR-375 silencing decreases the production of pro-inflammatory macrophages and subsequent inflammatory response. While pro-inflammatory macrophages are responsible for killing pathogens, a sustained pro-inflammatory response leads to a long list of disorders (e.g. arthritis, asthma, atherosclerosis, blindness, cancer, and diabetes).

Since miR-375 silencing inhibits the production of pro-inflammatory macrophages, it can delay the onset of atherosclerosis (the main underlying cause of heart attacks and strokes) in mice, indicating its therapeutic potential in conditions accompanied by chronic inflammation. Interestingly, miR-375 enhances macrophage migration into cancer cells by targeting PNX and TSN3, which are both proteins involved maintaining cell structure and organization.

== See also ==
- MicroRNA
