= MTPN =

Protein coding gene in Homo sapiens

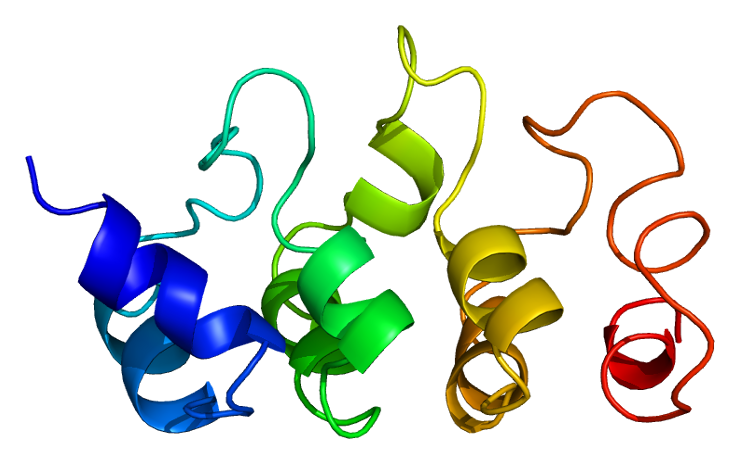

Identifiers
- Aliases: MTPN, GCDP, V-1, myotrophin
- External IDs: OMIM: 606484; MGI: 99445; GeneCards: MTPN
Available structures
| PDB | Ortholog search: PDBe RCSB |
| PDB | List of PDB id codes 3AAA |

Gene location (Human)
| Chr. | Chromosome 7 (human) |
| Band | 7q33 | Start | 135,926,760 bp |
| Band | 7q33 | End | 135,977,359 bp |

Gene location (Mouse)
| Chr. | Chromosome 6 (mouse) |
| Band | 6|6 B1 | Start | 35,485,841 bp |
| Band | 6|6 B1 | End | 35,516,823 bp |
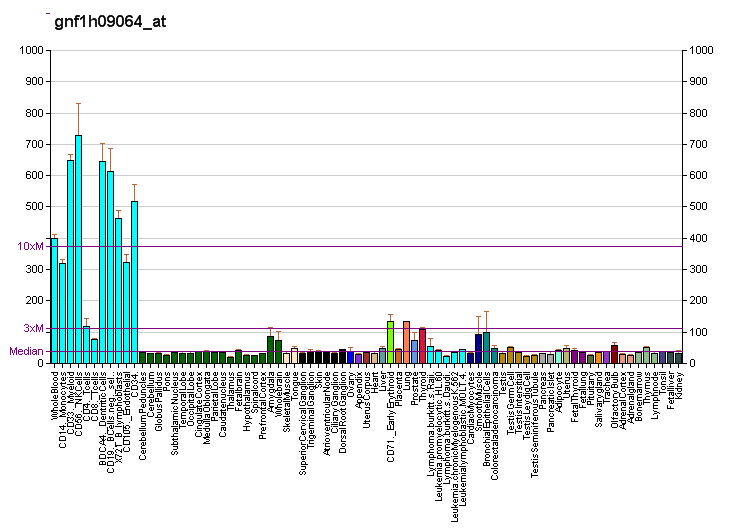
RNA expression pattern
| Bgee | Human / Mouse (ortholog); Top expressed in: cardiac muscle tissue of right atrium; skin of arm; mucosa of ileum; myocardium of left ventricle; superficial temporal artery; monocyte; lower lobe of lung; trabecular bone; Brodmann area 46; tibialis anterior muscle / Top expressed in: retinal pigment epithelium; Rostral migratory stream; barrel cortex; ciliary body; epithelium of lens; dorsal striatum; endothelial cell of lymphatic vessel; subiculum; prefrontal cortex; pineal gland; More reference expression data |
| BioGPS | More reference expression data |
Gene ontology
| Molecular function | sequence-specific DNA binding |
| Cellular component | cytoplasm; F-actin capping protein complex; axon; perinuclear region of cytoplasm; nucleus; cytosol |
| Biological process | regulation of striated muscle tissue development; catecholamine metabolic process; positive regulation of cardiac muscle hypertrophy; regulation of barbed-end actin filament capping; cellular response to mechanical stimulus; skeletal muscle tissue regeneration; neuron differentiation; striated muscle cell differentiation; regulation of translation; cerebellar granule cell differentiation; positive regulation of NF-kappaB transcription factor activity; positive regulation of cell growth; positive regulation of macromolecule biosynthetic process; regulation of cell size |
Sources:Amigo / QuickGO
Orthologs
| Databases | NCBI: entry; OMA: entry |
| Species | Human | Mouse |
| Entrez | 136319 | 14489 |
| Ensembl | ENSG00000105887 | ENSMUSG00000029840 |
| UniProt | P58546 | P62774 |
| RefSeq (mRNA) | NM_145808 | NM_008098 |
| RefSeq (protein) | NP_665807 | NP_032124 |
| Location (UCSC) | Chr 7: 135.93 – 135.98 Mb | Chr 6: 35.49 – 35.52 Mb |
| PubMed search |
- Wikidata
| View/Edit Human | View/Edit Mouse |

Myotrophin is a protein that in humans is encoded by the MTPN gene.

== Interactions ==
MTPN has been shown to interact with RELA and REL.
