= Western pattern diet =

Modern dietary pattern

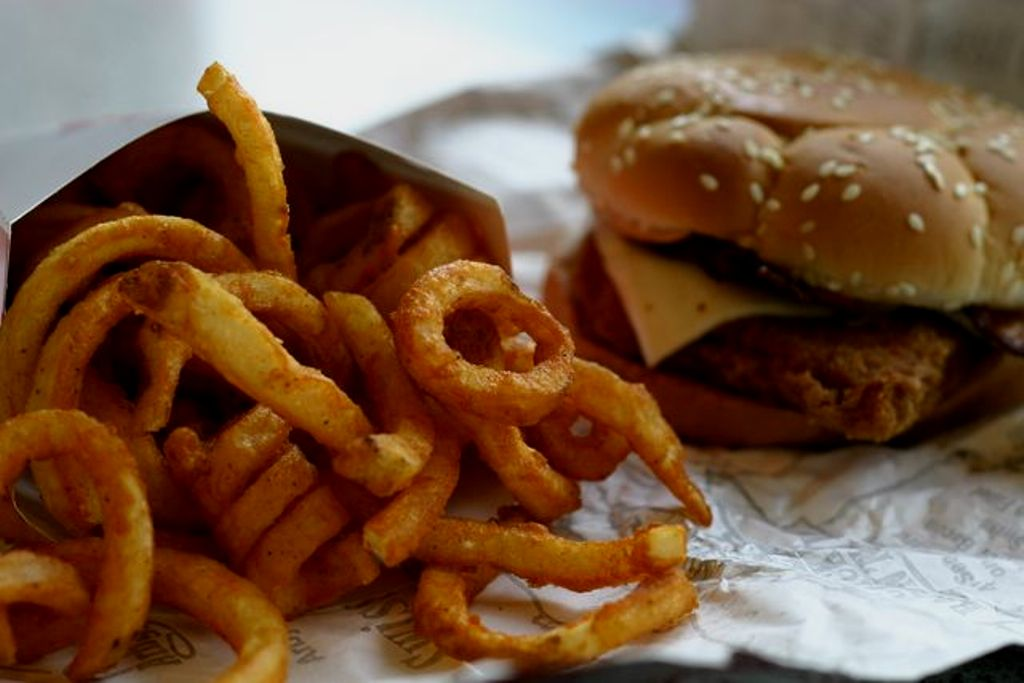
Fast food is a typical example of food consumed in the "standard American diet", which was brought about in part by fundamental lifestyle changes following the Neolithic Revolution, and later, the Industrial Revolution.

The Western pattern diet is a modern dietary pattern originating in the industrialized West which is generally characterized by high intakes of pre-packaged foods, refined grains, red and processed meat, high-sugar drinks, candy and sweets, fried foods, high-fat dairy products (such as butter), eggs, potato products, and corn products (including high-fructose corn syrup). Conversely, there are generally low intakes of fruits, vegetables, whole grains, fish, nuts, and seeds. The nature of production also affects the nutrient profile, as in the example of industrially produced animal products versus pasture-raised animal products. Artificial dyes like Red 40 are also prioritized over natural ones.

Dietary pattern analysis focuses on overall diets (such as the Mediterranean diet) rather than individual foods or nutrients. Compared to a so-called "prudent pattern diet", which has higher proportions of "fruit, vegetables, whole grains, and poultry", the Western pattern diet is associated with higher risks of cardiovascular disease and obesity.

== Elements ==
Food available to Americans since 1910. Consumption of meat, grain, fruits, and vegetables has risen; consumption of dairy has fallen.

Consumption of beef in the US has fallen since the 1970s, while chicken consumption has grown dramatically. Fish and pork remain constant.

This diet is "rich in red meat, dairy products, processed and artificially sweetened foods, and salt, with minimal intake of fruits, vegetables, fish, legumes, and whole grains." Various foods and food processing procedures that had been introduced during the Neolithic and Industrial Periods had fundamentally altered 7 nutritional characteristics of ancestral hominin diets: glycemic load, fatty acid composition, macronutrient composition, micronutrient density, acid-base balance, sodium-potassium ratio, and fiber content.

In 2006 the typical American diet was about 2,200 kilocalories (9,200 kJ) per day, with 50% of calories from carbohydrates, 15% protein, and 35% fat. These macronutrient intakes fall within the Acceptable Macronutrient Distribution Ranges (AMDR) for adults identified by the Food and Nutrition Board of the United States Institute of Medicine as "associated with reduced risk of chronic diseases while providing adequate intakes of essential nutrients," which are 45–65% carbohydrate, 10–35% protein, and 20–35% fat as a percentage of total energy. However, the nutritional quality of the specific foods comprising those macronutrients is often poor, as with the "Western" pattern discussed above. Complex carbohydrates such as starch are believed to be more healthy than sugar, which is frequently consumed in the standard American diet.

The energy-density of a typical Western pattern diet has continuously increased over time. USDA research conducted in the mid-2010s suggests that the average intake of American adults is at least 2,390 kcal (10,000 kJ) per day. Researchers that used different data collection/analysis methods have predicted that the average was about 3,680 kcal (15,400 kJ) per day. By contrast, a healthy daily intake is much lower. Since American adults usually have sedentary lifestyles guidelines suggest 1,600–2,000 kcal (6,700–8,400 kJ) is appropriate for most women and 2,000–2,600 kcal (8,400–10,900 kJ) is appropriate for men with the same physical activity level.

A review of eating habits in the United States in 2004 found that about 75% of restaurant meals were from fast-food restaurants. Nearly half of the meals ordered from a menu were hamburgers, French fries, or poultry — and about one third of orders included a soft drink. From 1970 to 2008, the per capita consumption of calories increased by nearly 25% in the United States and about 10% of all calories were from high-fructose corn syrup.

Americans consume more than 13% of their daily calories in the form of added sugars. Beverages such as flavored water, soft drinks, and sweetened caffeinated beverages make up 47% of these added sugars.

Americans ages 1 and above consume significantly more added sugars, oils, saturated fats, and sodium than recommended in the dietary guidelines outlined by the Office of Disease Prevention and Health Promotion. 89% of Americans consume more sodium than recommended. Additionally, excessive consumption of oils, saturated fats, and added sugars is seen in 72%, 71%, and 70% of the American population, respectively.

Consumers began turning to margarine due to concerns over the high levels of saturated fats found in butter. By 1958, margarine had become more commonly consumed than butter, with the average American consuming 8.9 pounds (4 kg) of margarine per year. Margarine is produced by refining vegetable oils, a process that introduces trans elaidic acid not found naturally in food. The consumption of trans fatty acids such as trans elaidic acid has been linked to cardiovascular disease. By 2005, margarine consumption had fallen below butter consumption due to the risks associated with trans fat intake.

Vegetable consumption is low among Americans, with only 13% of the population consuming the recommended amounts. Boys ages 9 to 13 and girls ages 14 to 18 consume the lowest amounts of vegetables relative to the general population. Potatoes and tomatoes, which are key components of many meals, account for 39% of the vegetables consumed by Americans. 60% of vegetables are consumed individually, 30% are included as part of a dish, and 10% are found in sauces.

Whole grains should consist of over half of total grain consumption, and refined grains should not exceed half of total grain consumption. However, 85.3% of the cereals eaten by Americans are produced with refined grains, where the germ and bran are removed. Grain refining increases shelf life and softens breads and pastries; however, the process of refining decreases its nutritional quality.

== Environmental impact ==
The transition into a more westernised diet has several implications, particularly regarding the exportation of foods. As populations become more affluent, reflected in a growing GDP, they have more disposable income to purchase food from other countries, which facilitates this dietary transition . This has been observed in many developing nations. In low and middle income countries, this transition is rapid, and this is observed in countries such as Brazil, India, and South Africa. Westernised diets contribute to increasing greenhouse gas emissions, driving biodiversity loss, soil degradation and exacerbating water shortages. This occurs due to the large global supply chains that food production is a part of. Large areas in Latin America and South-East Asia dedicate a large proportion of their land towards agriculture and forestry, which then gets exported to other countries. This growing use of exports is driving greenhouse gas emissions and has become a major driver of deforestation. Studies show that shifting from Western diets to more environmentally sustainable dietary patterns can help to reduce 70% of greenhouse gas emissions and up to 50% of water use.

Changing global diets also increase emissions. Increasing per capita incomes leads to urbanisation of a population. When this occurs, populations substitute a low-calorie and vegetable intense diet for more energy-intensive products that are characterised by increase in meat and refined fats, oils and sugar consumption. Once a nation reaches a certain point in development, diet can become the main driver for emissions, particularly when it is focused on a westernised diet.

== Health concerns ==
Based on preliminary epidemiological studies, compared to a healthy diet, the Western pattern diet is positively correlated with an elevated incidence of obesity, death from heart disease, cancer (especially colon cancer), and other "Western pattern diet"-related diseases. It increases the risk of metabolic syndrome and may have a negative impact on cardio-metabolic health.

=== Crohn's disease ===
A Western pattern diet has been associated with Crohn's disease. Crohn's disease has effects on the symbiotic bacteria within the human gut that show a positive correlation with a Western pattern diet. Symptoms can range from abdominal pain to diarrhea and fever.

=== Obesity ===
Obesity among various developed countries (as of 2003)

A Western pattern diet is associated with an increased risk of obesity. There is a positive correlation between a Western pattern diet and several plasma biomarkers that may be mediators of obesity, such as HDL cholesterol, high levels of fasting insulin, and leptin. Meta-analyses have also shown that, compared to a healthy diet, a Western pattern diet is linked to increased weight gain among females and adolescents.

=== Diabetes ===
Several studies have shown that there is a positive correlation between adoption of a Western pattern diet and incidence of type 2 diabetes among both men and women.

=== Cancer ===
The Western pattern diet has been generally linked to increased risk for colorectal cancer. Meta-analyses have found that diet patterns consistent with those of the Western pattern diet are positively correlated with risk for prostate cancer. Greater adherence to a Western pattern diet was also found to increase the overall risk of mortality due to cancer.

No significant relation has been established between the Western pattern diet and breast cancer.

== Prevalence ==
In recent years, diets in developing countries such as Mexico, South Africa, and India have transitioned to adopt more elements of the western-style diet. Overall dietary consumption in these regions now reflects a higher balance of processed sugars and fats over lower-calorie food groups like vegetables and starches. In accordance with this pattern, the western-versus-eastern dichotomy has become less relevant as such a diet is no longer "foreign" to any global region (just as traditional East Asian cuisine is no longer "foreign" to the west), but the term is still a well-understood shorthand in medical literature, regardless of where the diet is found. Other dietary patterns described in the medical research include "drinker" (sandwiches, snacks, processed meat, and alcoholic beverages) and "meat-eater" (meat, poultry, and margarine) patterns. Because of the variability in diets, individuals are usually classified not as simply "following" or "not following" a given diet, but instead by ranking them according to how closely their diets line up with each pattern in turn. The researchers then compare the outcomes between the group that most closely follows a given pattern to the group that least closely follows a given pattern.

== History ==
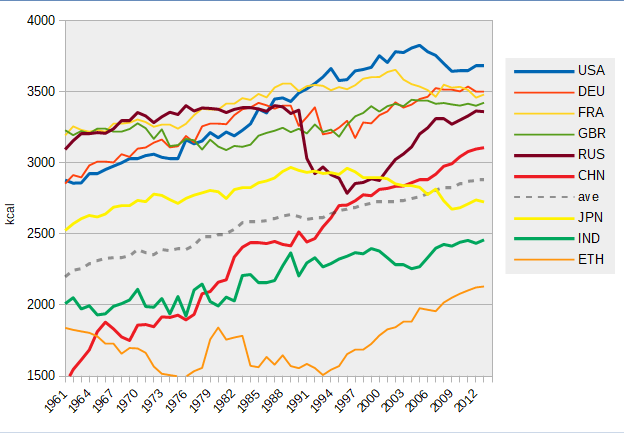
Changes of food supply (by energy) Other area (Yr 2010) * Africa, sub-Sahara - 2170 kcal/capita/day * N.E. and N. Africa - 3120 kcal/capita/day * South Asia - 2450 kcal/capita/day * East Asia - 3040 kcal/capita/day * Latin America / Caribbean - 2950 kcal/capita/day * Developed countries - 3470 kcal/capita/day

The Western diet present in today's world is a consequence of the Neolithic Revolution and Industrial Revolutions. The Neolithic Revolution introduced the staple foods of the western diet, including domesticated meats, sugar, alcohol, salt, cereal grains, and dairy products. The modern Western diet emerged after the Industrial Revolution, which introduced new methods of food processing including the addition of cereals, refined sugars, and refined vegetable oils to the Western diet, and also increased the fat content of domesticated meats. More recently, food processors began replacing sugar with high-fructose corn syrup.

== See also ==
- European cuisine
- Ultraprocessed food
- Fast food
- Healthy diet
- Junk food
- List of diets
- Mediterranean diet
- Metabolic syndrome
- Nutritional gatekeeper
