= PTPMT1 =

Protein-coding gene in the species Homo sapiens

Identifiers
- Aliases: PTPMT1, DUSP23, MOSP, PLIP, PNAS-129, protein tyrosine phosphatase, mitochondrial 1, protein tyrosine phosphatase mitochondrial 1
- External IDs: OMIM: 609538; MGI: 1913711; GeneCards: PTPMT1
Available structures
PDB	Ortholog search: PDBe RCSB
PDB	List of PDB id codes 3RGO, 3RGQ
Enzyme activity
EC #	BRENDA	ExPASy	KEGG	MetaCyc
3.1.3.16	↗	↗	↗	↗
3.1.3.27	↗	↗	↗	↗
3.1.3.48	↗	↗	↗	↗

Gene location (Human)
Chr.	Chromosome 11 (human)
Band	11p11.2	Start	47,565,430 bp
Band	11p11.2	End	47,573,461 bp

Gene location (Mouse)
Chr.	Chromosome 2 (mouse)
Band	2|2 E1	Start	90,739,060 bp
Band	2|2 E1	End	90,748,389 bp
RNA expression pattern
Bgee	Human / Mouse (ortholog); Top expressed in: left testis; right testis; putamen; left adrenal cortex; substantia nigra; hypothalamus; right adrenal gland; caudate nucleus; right adrenal cortex; nucleus accumbens / Top expressed in: left ventricle; interventricular septum; quadriceps femoris muscle; spermatid; white adipose tissue; testicle; peripheral nervous system; superior cervical ganglion; muscle tissue; muscle of thigh; More reference expression data
BioGPS	n/a
Gene ontology
Molecular function	phosphoprotein phosphatase activity; phosphatase activity; phosphatidylinositol-4,5-bisphosphate 5-phosphatase activity; protein binding; phosphatidylglycerophosphatase activity; protein tyrosine phosphatase activity; hydrolase activity; protein tyrosine/serine/threonine phosphatase activity
Cellular component	membrane; mitochondrion; mitochondrial inner membrane; nucleus
Biological process	lipid metabolism; protein dephosphorylation; phospholipid biosynthetic process; cardiolipin biosynthetic process; peptidyl-tyrosine dephosphorylation; dephosphorylation; phosphatidylglycerol biosynthetic process; regulation of intrinsic apoptotic signaling pathway
Sources:Amigo / QuickGO
Orthologs
Databases	NCBI: entry; OMA: entry
Species	Human	Mouse
Entrez	114971	66461
Ensembl	ENSG00000110536; ENSG00000285206	ENSMUSG00000063235
UniProt	Q8WUK0	Q66GT5
RefSeq (mRNA)	NM_175732; NM_001143984	NM_025576
RefSeq (protein)	NP_001137456; NP_783859	NP_079852
Location (UCSC)	Chr 11: 47.57 – 47.57 Mb	Chr 2: 90.74 – 90.75 Mb
PubMed search
- Wikidata
View/Edit Human	View/Edit Mouse

Protein tyrosine phosphatase, mitochondrial 1 is a protein in humans that is primarily coded by the gene PTPMT1 gene.
