= FOX proteins =

Family of transcription factors involved in anatomical development

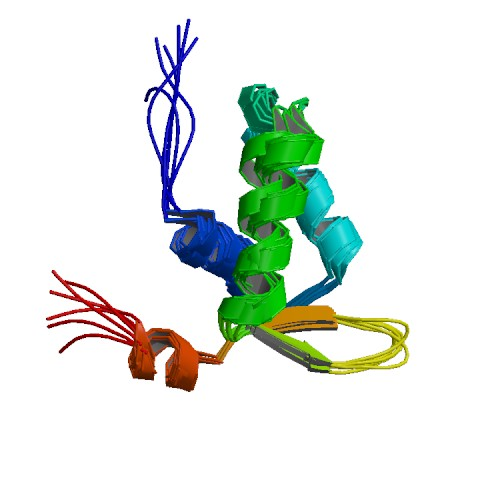
NMR solution structure of human FOXP1

FOX (forkhead box) proteins are a family of transcription factors that play important roles in regulating the expression of genes involved in cell growth, proliferation, differentiation, and longevity. Many FOX proteins are important to embryonic development. FOX proteins also have pioneering transcription activity by being able to bind condensed chromatin during cell differentiation processes.

There are 50 different FOX genes encoding FOX proteins in humans that are further divided into 19 subdivisions based on conserved sequence similarity. The defining feature of FOX proteins is the forkhead box, a sequence of 80 to 100 amino acids forming a motif that binds to DNA. This forkhead motif is also called a winged helix, due to the butterfly-like appearance of the loops in the protein structure of the domain. FOX proteins are a subgroup of the helix-turn-helix class of proteins.

== Biological roles ==
FOX genes are key elements in many developmental and biological processes, including regulating the cell cycle, metabolism, apoptosis, immune control, and pluripotency of embryonic stem cells. Beginning in unicellular eukaryotes, FOX genes developed by means of duplication and evolutionary divergence to acquire specialized roles. By binding to particular DNA sequences, these proteins control gene expression and so affect cellular differentiation and organogenesis.

Many genes encoding FOX proteins have been identified. There are 50 FOX genes in humans, divided into 19 different subclasses from FOXA to FOXS, based on conserved sequences. These subdivisions have diverse functions across different tissues and biological processes and genes within a given subunit often exhibit functional similarities. For example, the FOXM genes encode proteins that are involved in cell cycle progression. FOXC genes encode proteins that ensure normal embryonic development and play a key role in the growth and function of different organs.

FOX proteins play an important role in apoptosis and function as tumor suppressors, removing damaged cells. This is done via a mitochondria-dependent pathway or a mitochondria-independent pathway. In the mitochondria-independent pathway, FOX proteins increase the expression of death receptor ligands such as Fas ligand (FasL) and TNF-related apoptosis-inducing ligand (TRAIL). In the mitochondria-dependent pathway, FOX proteins activate pro-apoptotic Bcl-2 family proteins.

FOXM1 is a well-defined transcription factor controlling genes linked to cell cycle development, preserving cellular homeostasis. FOXM1 promotes the entry of a cell into the S phase and ensures the cell undergoes mitosis properly. FOXM1 activity is regulated by proliferation and anti-proliferation signals. FOXM1 is a highly expressed tumour repressor in growing cells and contributes to tumorigenesis when dysregulated. Phosphorylation events regulate FOXM1 activity by influencing its localization and transcriptional action.

The FOXO1 gene is involved in maintaining the pluripotency of embryonic stem cells. FOXO1 regulates critical pluripotency associated genes such as OCT4, NANOG and SOX2 (Oct4 and Sox2 are Yamanaka factors) by occupying and activating their promoters. This function can be inhibited by the ATK protein kinase. The FOXO genes also play a role in the regulation of metabolism. FOXO proteins translate insulin and growth factor signaling into physiological responses, including suppressing gene expression. FOXO1 is involved in promoting gluconeogenesis in the liver by interacting with PGC-1α. This interaction can be inhibited by phosphorylation events, where FOXO1 is removed from the nucleus.

Some FOX genes are downstream targets of the hedgehog signaling pathway, which plays a role in the development of basal cell carcinomas. Members of class O (FOXO- proteins) regulate metabolism, cellular proliferation, stress tolerance and possibly lifespan. The activity of FoxO is controlled by post-translational modifications, including phosphorylation, acetylation and ubiquitination.

== Post-translational modifications ==
Control of FOX protein activity, localization, and stability depends critically on post-translational modifications (PTMs). These modifications, including phosphorylation, methylation and acetylation, help FOX proteins respond to various cellular signals, thereby enabling them to mediate essential biological processes such as apoptosis, cell survival, and cell cycle progression.

Among the primary PTMs influencing FOX proteins is phosphorylation. For instance, phosphorylation of FOXO proteins can drive their nuclear translocation in response to stress signals, which is necessary for starting apoptotic gene expression. This change allows FOXO proteins to mediate the stress reaction and control cell survival. Additionally, under control by phosphorylation is FOXM1, a necessary component of cell cycle progression. Specifically, phosphorylation increases the transcriptional activity of FOXM1, so advancing cell cycle progression during DNA replication and mitosis, which is a process essential for appropriate cellular growth.

Particularly in relation to the development of cancer and the way cells traverse their growth cycle, acetylation is particularly crucial in determining the function of FOXM1. Enzymes such as p300/CBP add acetyl groups to specific sites on the FOXM1 protein, thus this process occurs. Particularly, this happens at particular lysine residues, including K63, K422, K440, K603, and K614. FOXM1 is able to greatly increase its capacity to activate genes linked with DNA copying and cell division by means of acetylation. Remarkably, the degree of acetylation of FOXM1 varies during the cell cycle rather than being constant. It peaks in the S, G2, and M phases of the cell cycle—the times when cells are actively getting ready for division. During these phases, the acetylated form of FOXM1 can more readily attach to its target genes, helping the cell to move through the cell cycle. On the other hand, FOXM1 becomes less active in the G1 phase, and the degree of acetylation also falls here. This variation in acetylation serves as a timing mechanism to guarantee that FOXM1 only acts when the cell needs it. Regarding cancer, the stakes are even higher. Acetylation improves FOXM1's capacity to activate genes, helping cancer cells grow, survive, and repair their DNA. When FOXM1 cannot be acetylated, as is the case when mutations stop the process from happening, its capacity to activate genes reduces, as well as its capacity to cause the development of tumours. This is why scientists are looking at several approaches to interfere with FOXM1's acetylation in order to either stop or slow down cancer's spread. The focus of this process could create fresh paths for the evolution of the next treatments.

Another post translational modification of the FOX protein involves adding methyl groups to specific amino acids. These modifications play a crucial role in immune response, cancer progression, and aging by altering FOX protein functions through protein-level changes.

== Discovery ==
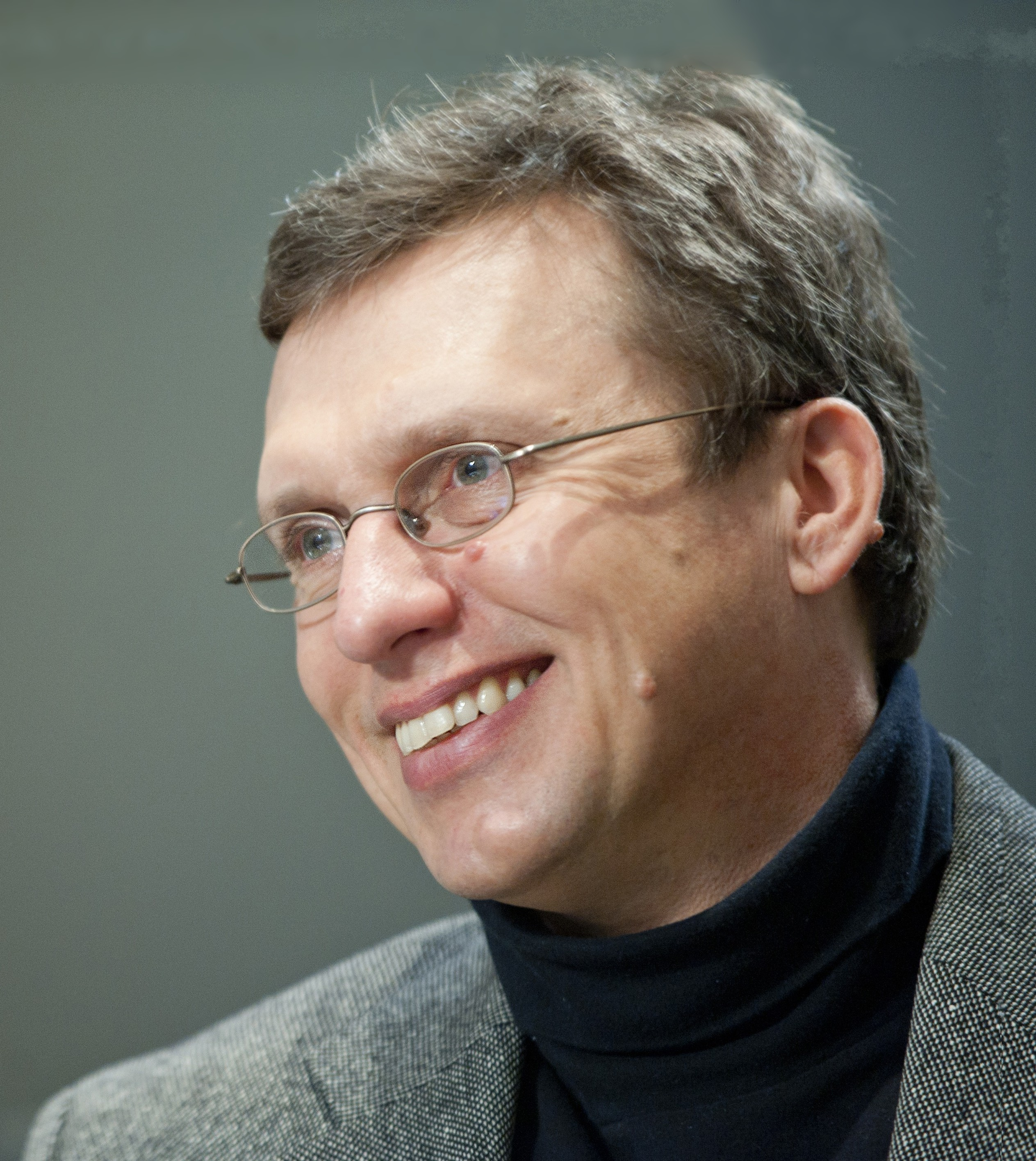
Detlef Weigel in 2013

The founding member and namesake of the FOX family is the fork head transcription factor in Drosophila, discovered by German biologists Detlef Weigel and Herbert Jäckle. Since then a large number of family members have been discovered, especially in vertebrates. Originally, they were given vastly different names (such as HFH, FREAC, and fkh), but in 2000 a unified nomenclature was introduced that grouped the FOX proteins into subclasses (FOXA-FOXS) based on sequence conservation.

The discovery of the FOX gene family and its evolutionary significance was outlined in a 2009 study by Hannenhalli and Kaestner. The researchers detailed how FOX genes, originating in unicellular eukaryotes, evolved through gene duplication and loss events to form a complex family in mammals. This study also highlighted the diverse biological roles of FOX genes, including contributions to developmental processes such as organogenesis and speech acquisition, and their association with various diseases, including cancer and language disorders.

== Genes ==
- FOXA1, FOXA2, FOXA3 (See also Hepatocyte nuclear factors.)
- FOXB1, FOXB2
- FOXC1 (associated with glaucoma), FOXC2 (varicose veins)
- FOXD1, FOXD2, FOXD3 (vitiligo), FOXD4, FOXD4L1, FOXD4L3, FOXD4L4, FOXD4L5, FOXD4L6
- FOXE1 (thyroid), FOXE3 (lens)
- FOXF1 (lung), FOXF2
- FOXG1 (brain)
- FOXH1 (widely expressed)
- FOXI1 (ear), FOXI2, FOXI3
- FOXJ1 (cilia), FOXJ2 (erythroid), FOXJ3
- FOXK1, FOXK2 (HIV, IL-2, adrenal)
- FOXL1 (ovary), FOXL2
- FOXM1 (cell cycle, erythroid, cancer)
- FOXN1 (hair, thymus), FOXN2, FOXN3 (cell cycle checkpoints; widely expressed), FOXN4
- FOXO1 (widely expressed: muscle, liver, pancreas), FOXO3 (apoptosis, erythroid, longevity), FOXO4 (widely expressed), FOXO6 (liver, skeletal muscle, brain)
- FOXP1 (pluripotency then brain, heart and lung), FOXP2 (widely expressed? brain; language), FOXP3 (T cells), FOXP4 – may be ancestrally responsible for motor learning, based on insect studies (where there's only one FoxP)
- FOXQ1
- FOXR1, FOXR2
- FOXS1

== Cancer ==
FOX genes must be under extreme evolutionary supervision in a genomic sequence or cis-acting elements. If not, they can lead to the development of many different types of cancer, including carcinoma, breast cancer, prostate cancer, and acute lymphocytic leukemia.

Depending on the subfamily, the deregulation of FOX proteins is often associated with tumorigenesis and can act as a tumor suppressor or an oncogene. Changes in post-translational modifications, genetic events, or oncoviruses are known causes for this deregulation.

FOX proteins play critical roles in cellular homeostasis as they act as both tumor suppressors and oncogenes depending on the context. Dysregulation of FOX proteins may also contribute to diseases such as neurodevelopmental disorders and metabolic syndromes. For example, FOXM1 is essential for cell cycle progression and is frequently over-expressed in tumors while FOXO proteins regulate apoptosis and stress responses indicating they often act as tumor suppressors.

A member of the FOX family, FOXD2, has been detected progressively over-expressed in human-papillomavirus-positive neoplastic keratinocytes derived from uterine cervical preneoplastic lesions at different levels of malignancy. For this reason, this gene is likely to be associated with tumorigenesis and may be a potential prognostic marker for uterine cervical preneoplastic lesions progression.

Additional FOX family members have also been implicated in cancer progression and metastasis. FOXP1 acts as a tumor suppressor in breast and prostate cancers while showing oncogenic traits in certain lymphomas and leukemias. FOXP3 which is crucial for regulatory T cell function has been shown to repress oncogenic pathways and exhibits tumor suppressive behaviour in breast and prostate cancers.

FOXD2-AS1 is a long non-coding RNA related to the FOXD2 gene which serves as a potential biomarker in cancer. It is over-expressed in several malignancies including colorectal and gastric cancers and has been associated with poor prognosis and increased proliferation, invasion, and migration of cancer cells.

FOXQ1 is found to promote epithelial-mesenchymal transition which is a process that promotes invasion and metastasis through the repression of epithelial markers such as E-cadherin and increases expression of mesenchymal genes. Over-expression of FOXQ1 has been linked to colorectal, gastric, and lung cancers, where it contributes to the tumor progression.

FOXK2 has been linked to cancer and can function differently depending on the tissue type and molecular pathway it interacts with. In non-small-cell lung cancer, FOXK2 suppresses tumor progression by down-regulating cyclin D1 and CDKs allowing for the inhibition of cell proliferation and invasion.

FOXO3a is another member that exhibits tissue-specific behaviour in cancer. In gastric cancer, its over-expression promotes invasion and migration by up-regulating cathepsin L which promotes epithelial-mesenchymal transition. FOXO3a also acts as a tumor suppressor in nephroblastoma by inhibiting proliferation and invasion while inducing apoptosis. In breast cancer, FOXO3a suppresses metastasis by down-regulating TWIST-1.
