= FOXD4L6 =

Human gene

Identifiers
- Aliases: FOXD4L6, forkhead box D4-like 6, forkhead box D4 like 6
- External IDs: MGI: 1347467; GeneCards: FOXD4L6

Gene location (Human)
Chr.	Chromosome 9 (human)
Band	9p11.2	Start	41,126,435 bp
Band	9p11.2	End	41,128,681 bp

Gene location (Mouse)
Chr.	Chromosome 19 (mouse)
Band	19 B|19 19.86 cM	Start	24,876,600 bp
Band	19 B|19 19.86 cM	End	24,878,561 bp
RNA expression pattern
Bgee	Human / Mouse (ortholog); Top expressed in: right uterine tube; Brodmann area 9; right frontal lobe; hippocampus proper; cerebellar hemisphere; prefrontal cortex; anterior cingulate cortex; superior frontal gyrus; right hemisphere of cerebellum; nucleus accumbens / Top expressed in: granulocyte; embryo; hypoblast; embryonic organizer; red nucleus; endoderm; notochord; spermatocyte; mesoderm; spinal ganglia; More reference expression data
BioGPS	n/a
Gene ontology
Molecular function	DNA-binding transcription factor activity; sequence-specific DNA binding; DNA binding; protein binding; DNA-binding transcription factor activity, RNA polymerase II-specific
Cellular component	nucleus
Biological process	regulation of transcription, DNA-templated; transcription, DNA-templated; regulation of transcription by RNA polymerase II; anatomical structure morphogenesis; cell differentiation
Sources:Amigo / QuickGO
Orthologs
Databases	NCBI: entry; OMA: entry
Species	Human	Mouse
Entrez	653404	14237
Ensembl	ENSG00000273514	ENSMUSG00000051490
UniProt	Q3SYB3	Q60688
RefSeq (mRNA)	NM_001085476	NM_008022
RefSeq (protein)	NP_001078945	NP_032048
Location (UCSC)	Chr 9: 41.13 – 41.13 Mb	Chr 19: 24.88 – 24.88 Mb
PubMed search
- Wikidata
View/Edit Human	View/Edit Mouse

Forkhead box D4 like 6 (FOXD4L6) is a protein in Homo sapiens encoded by the FOXD4L6 gene. As a member of the Forkhead box (FOX) transcription factor family it functions as a nuclear DNA-binding transcription factor.

Forkhead box D4-like 6
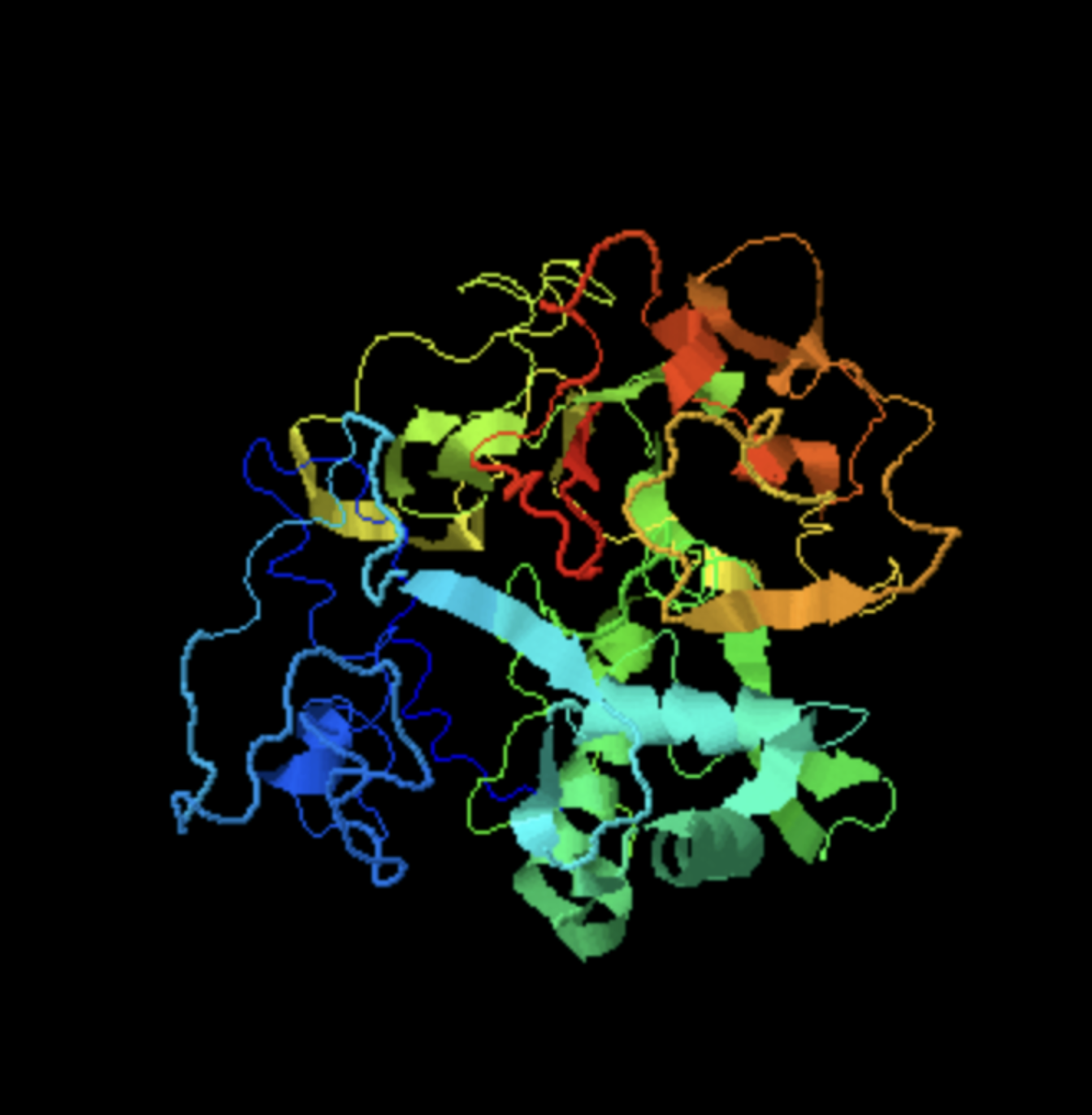
- Predicted 3D structure of human FOXD4L6 highlighting the DNA-binding domain and overall fold

Identifiers
- Symbol: FOXD4L6
- HGNC: HGNC:31986
- RefSeq: 653404
- UniProt: Q3SYB3

Other data
- Locus: Chr. 9 p11.2
Search for
- Structures: Swiss-model
- Domains: InterPro

== Gene identity ==
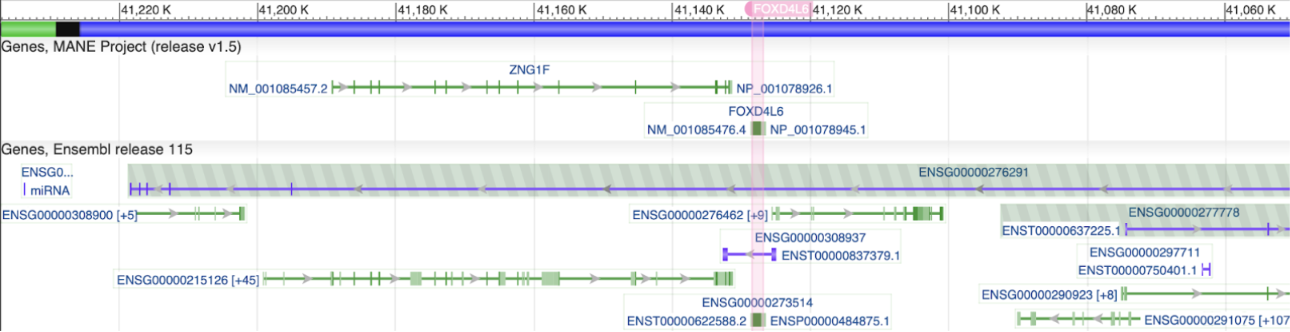
Genomic location of FOXD4L6 in chromosome 9

The gene lies within a FOXD4-like cluster and it has several neighboring loci, including FRG1HP, PGM5P2, LINC03025, and ZNG1F.

== mRNA transcript ==
Transcribed as a single-exon gene with no introns; the gene FOXD4L6 produces one major mRNA transcript that is then translated into a chain of 417 amino acids. Because the gene lacks introns, no alternative splicing or isoforms are reported.

== Evolution and homology ==
=== Gene family context ===
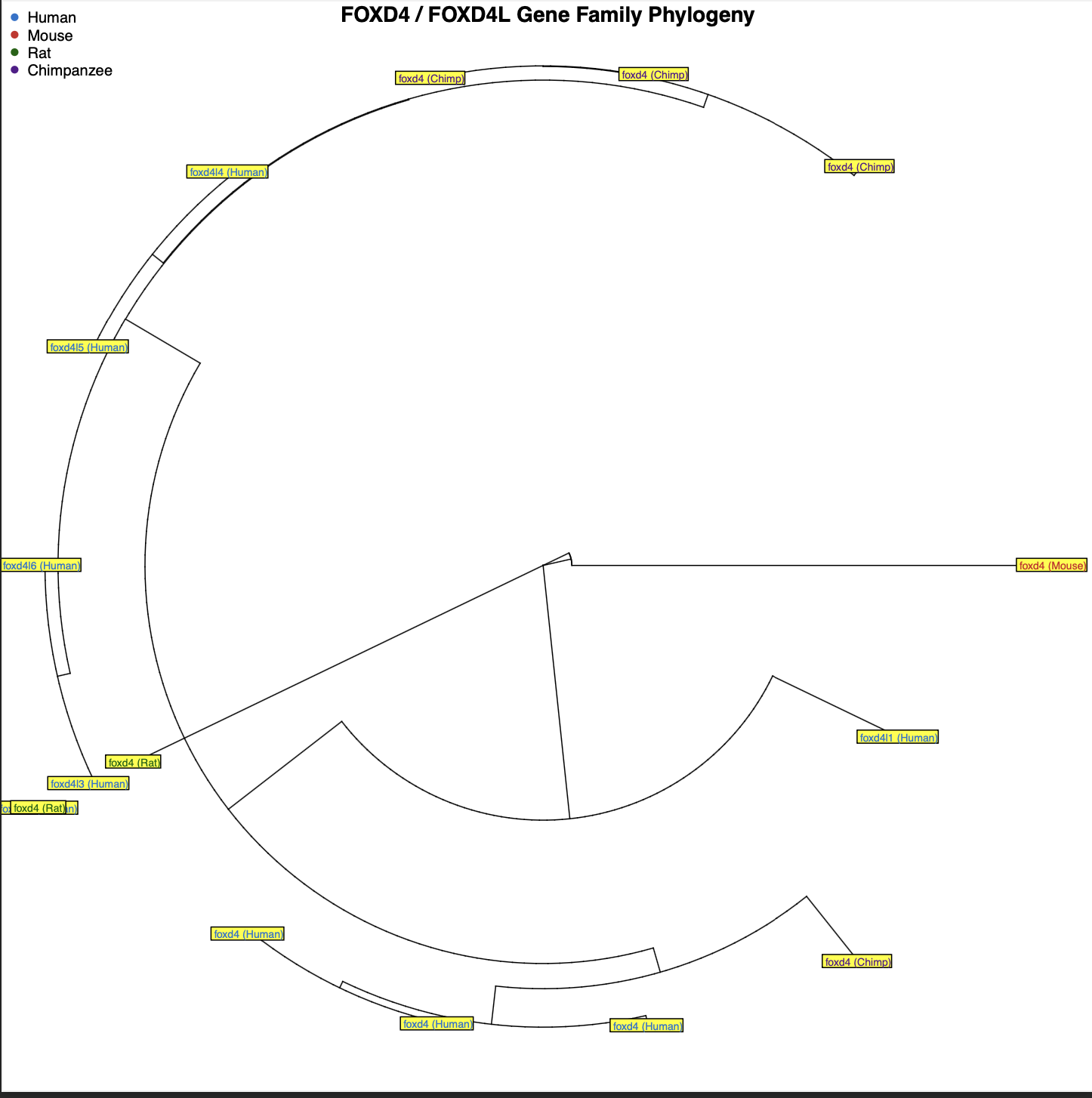
FOXD4/FOXD4L Gene Family Phylogeny.

FOXD4L6 belongs to the Forkhead box (FOX) gene family, an evolutionarily ancient group of transcription factors that originated in unicellular eukaryotes and expanded through multiple duplication events over the last 1.6 to 2.2 billion years.

==== Unifying feature : the forkhead (FKH) domain ====
The central FKH domain forms the double winged-helix structure responsible for DNA binding and shows the strongest conservation across vertebrates and invertebrates. In FOXD4L6, the forkhead DNA-binding region falls within the central portion, residue 108 to 202.

=== Homology ===
In vertebrates, the family diversified into more than ten subfamilies (FOXA–FOXS). The FOXD sub class includes FOXD1, FOXD2, FOXD3, and the FOXD4/FOXD4-like expansion present in primates. In humans, this expansion produced seven FOXD4L genes, including FOXD4L6.

Closely related paralogs were identified to be FOXD4, FOXD4L1–FOXD4L6, and more distantly FOXD1, FOXD2, and FOXD3. These paralogs display high sequence similarity, with the FOXD4-like members sharing ≥95% positive identity with FOXD4, and FOXD1/FOXD2/FOXD3 showing approximately 90% sequence identity to FOXD4L6.

Substantial residue identity was identified due to the highly conserved ~100-amino-acid forkhead (FKH) DNA-binding domain. Furthermore, other regions were identified; at the N-terminus, a negatively charged “acidic blob” enriched in aspartic acid and glutamic acid contributes to protein–protein interaction surfaces.

== Protein and expression ==
FOXD4L6 participates in transcriptional regulation via its forkhead domain and binds DNA in a sequence-specific manner.

=== Sub-cellular localization ===
Antibody-based proteomics data indicate that the FOXD4L6 protein localizes in the nuclei of the cell, with its predicted transcription factor role and chromatin association. No transmembrane segments or signal peptides are predicted, supporting nuclear residency without ER/Golgi trafficking.

=== Tissue expression ===
Transcriptomic datasets, including GTEx and the Human Protein Atlas, show that FOXD4L6 expression is enriched in the brain, particularly in neural tissues derived from the embryonic ectoderm. Microarray datasets from GEO reveal substantial variability in expression across cancer and non-cancer cell lines, with little consistency among replicate lines of the same cancer type.

== Regulatory features ==
Analysis of the FOXD4L6 promoter reveals two promoter regions containing binding motifs for zinc-finger proteins, TFAP2 transcription factors, nuclear receptors, STAT-family factors, and RREB1.

== Variants and post translational modifications (PTMs) ==
A number of genetic variations can occur along the residues of this protein. At least 70 different genetic variations of the base pairs composition were registered to form synonymous modifications, which means the final protein composition was not affected by such edits. Somatic mutations were hypothesized to occur in residues: 3, 45, 108, 110, 118, 144, 145, 157, 185, 239, 280, 315, and 364.

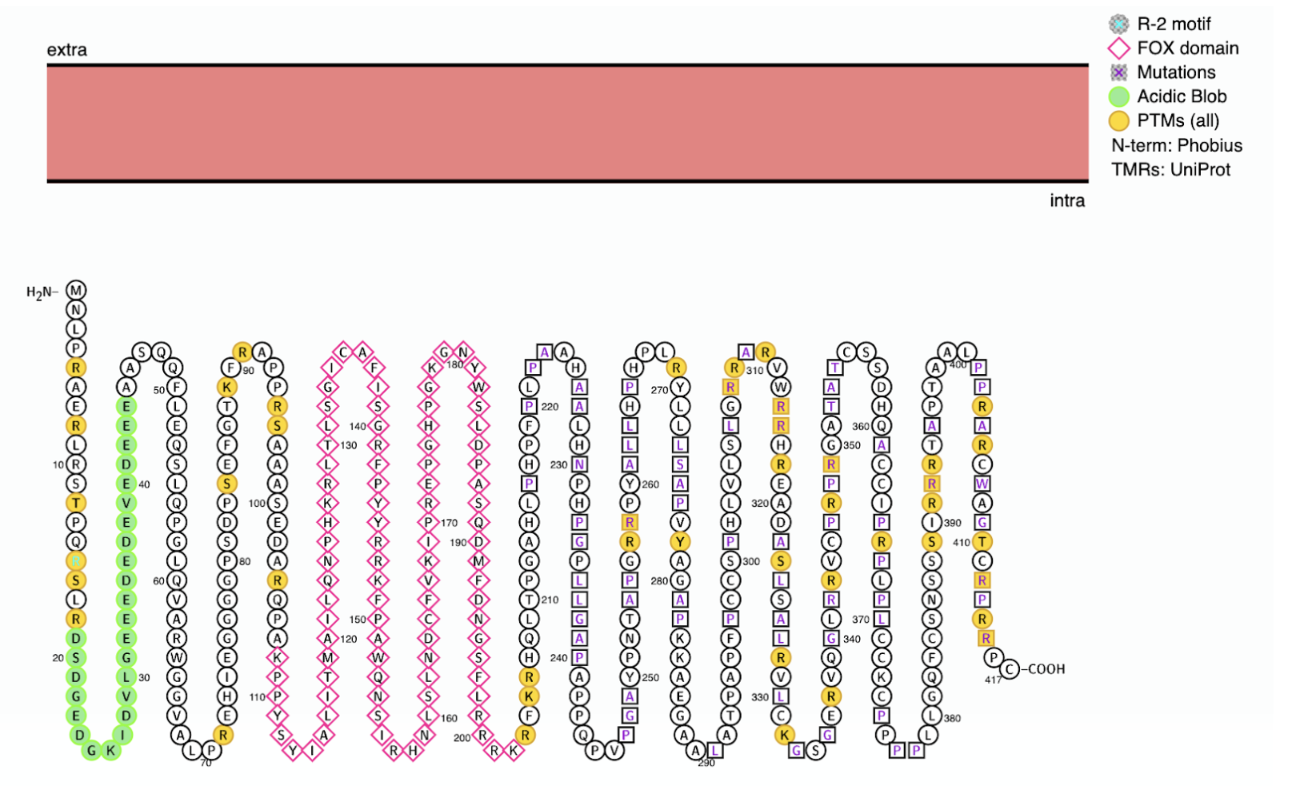
FOXD4L6 Protein Schematic: PTMs, variants, motifs

Computational analyses predict several PTMs across the FOXD4L6 sequence:

- Phosphorylation at multiple serine, threonine, and tyrosine residues, especially within disordered regions.
- Lysine and arginine methylation at solvent-exposed residues outside the forkhead domain.
- An extended acidic region (residues ~19–44) corresponding to a high-scoring negatively charged segment, consistent with acidic domains found in chromatin-associated transcription factors.
- DNA methylation analyses in lung squamous cell carcinoma identify FOXD4L6 as an unusually methylated gene, consistent with altered states in cancer cells.

== Protein interactions ==
Table 1: Comparative table showing predicted protein-protein interactions of human FOXD4L6, including interaction type, confidence score, and functional relevance.

Abbreviated name	Full name	Basis of identification	Notes / Function
KIAA0232	KIAA0232 (uncharacterized protein)	Poorly characterized protein. Likely intracellular. Biological function unknown; interaction confidence low/medium	Unknown function
HSPBAP1	Heat shock protein-associated protein 1	Interacts with small heat-shock proteins (HSPB family). May be involved in protein folding or chaperone-associated regulation. Likely intracellular.	Suggests possible role in protein folding or stabilization.
ZNF496	Zinc finger protein 496	DNA-binding zinc-finger transcription factor. Nuclear localization matches FOXD4L6.	High confidence (compPASS) score; suggests transcriptional co-regulation.
ZBTB9	Zinc finger and BTB domain–containing 9	BTB/Zinc-finger transcription factor.	Also of nuclear localization.
FOXD2	Forkhead box protein D2	Member of the forkhead (FOX) transcription factor family.	High confidence score compPASS ~ 0.994
FBN2	Fibrillin-2	Extracellular matrix (ECM) structural protein.	Extracellular TFs, not consistent with FOXD4L6 localization

== Clinical significance ==
=== Cancer-related expression ===
FOXD4L6 shows context-dependent expression across cancer.

Cancers like glioma and skull base chordoma showed moderate expression of the protein. Others like lymphoma, thyroid, and head-and-neck cancers showed frequently high protein expression.

pLEC (primary pulmonary lymphoepithelial carcinoma): FOXD4L6 and related genes often show copy number gains and over expression, with survival analyses correlating lower FOXD4L6 expression with better prognosis.

In thyroid carcinoma network analyses (CCMGDB), FOXD4L6 appears in normal-cell signaling networks but is absent from tumor-specific networks, consistent with down regulation in malignant tissue (tumor).

=== Cell viability and immune-related responses ===
Functional genomic screens examining cytotoxicity and immune signaling place FOXD4L6 within immune-associated networks.

In whole-genome RNAi screens using the immunotoxin SS1P, FOXD4L6 showed a subtle mitigator effect, suggesting a minor role in resistance to toxin-induced cell death.

In septic acute kidney injury studies, FOXD4L6 is included among genes that are connected to pathways in T-cell activation, neutrophil signaling, and cytokine responses.

Correlation studies revealed FOXD4L6 expression to be positively associated with CD8+ T-cell markers, hinting at a role in modulating tumor–immune interactions.
