= FOXN3 =

Protein-coding gene in the species Homo sapiens

Identifiers
- Aliases: FOXN3, C14orf116, CHES1, PRO1635, forkhead box N3
- External IDs: OMIM: 602628; MGI: 1918625; GeneCards: FOXN3

Gene location (Human)
Chr.	Chromosome 14 (human)
Band	14q31.3-q32.11	Start	89,124,871 bp
Band	14q31.3-q32.11	End	89,619,149 bp

Gene location (Mouse)
Chr.	Chromosome 12 (mouse)
Band	12|12 E	Start	99,156,337 bp
Band	12|12 E	End	99,529,841 bp
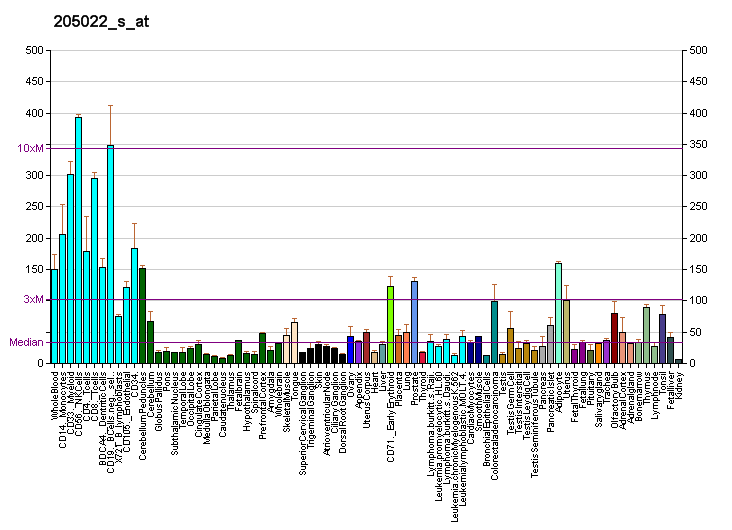

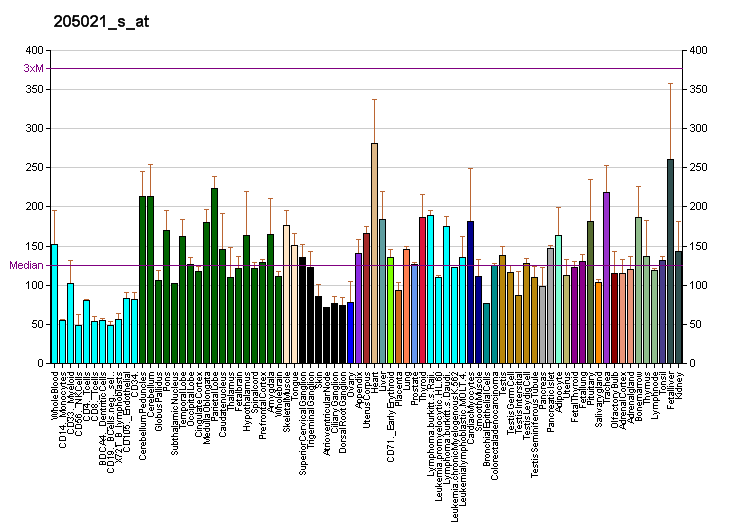

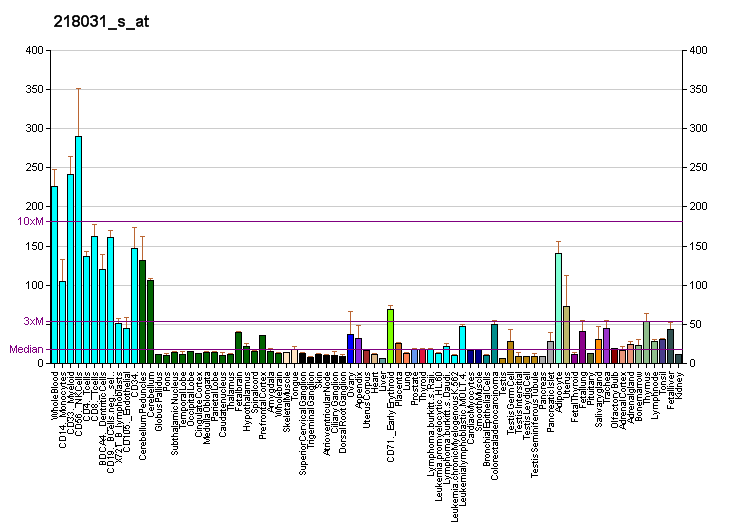
RNA expression pattern
Bgee	Human / Mouse (ortholog); Top expressed in: paraflocculus of cerebellum; tendon of biceps brachii; nipple; saphenous vein; skin of hip; skin of arm; mucosa of paranasal sinus; skin of thigh; synovial joint; Skeletal muscle tissue of rectus abdominis / Top expressed in: zygote; secondary oocyte; hand; ascending aorta; soleus muscle; Rostral migratory stream; tibialis anterior muscle; foot; gastrocnemius muscle; aortic valve; More reference expression data
BioGPS	More reference expression data
Gene ontology
Molecular function	DNA binding; protein C-terminus binding; protein binding; DNA-binding transcription factor activity; sequence-specific DNA binding; DNA-binding transcription factor activity, RNA polymerase II-specific
Cellular component	nucleus
Biological process	cell cycle; mitotic G2 DNA damage checkpoint signaling; negative regulation of transcription, DNA-templated; regulation of transcription, DNA-templated; transcription, DNA-templated; craniofacial suture morphogenesis; cell differentiation; positive regulation of transcription, DNA-templated; regulation of transcription by RNA polymerase II
Sources:Amigo / QuickGO
Orthologs
Databases	NCBI: entry; OMA: entry
Species	Human	Mouse
Entrez	1112	71375
Ensembl	ENSG00000053254	ENSMUSG00000033713
UniProt	O00409	Q499D0
RefSeq (mRNA)	NM_005197; NM_001085471	NM_183186
RefSeq (protein)	NP_001078940; NP_005188	NP_899009
Location (UCSC)	Chr 14: 89.12 – 89.62 Mb	Chr 12: 99.16 – 99.53 Mb
PubMed search
- Wikidata
View/Edit Human	View/Edit Mouse

Forkhead box protein N3 is a protein that in humans is encoded by the FOXN3 gene.

This gene is a member of the forkhead/winged helix transcription factor family. Checkpoints are eukaryotic DNA damage-inducible cell cycle arrests at G1 and G2. Checkpoint suppressor 1 suppresses multiple yeast checkpoint mutations including mec1, rad9, rad53 and dun1 by activating a MEC1-independent checkpoint pathway. Alternative splicing is observed at the locus, resulting in distinct isoforms.

== See also ==
- FOX proteins
