= DR1 (gene) =

Protein-coding gene in humans

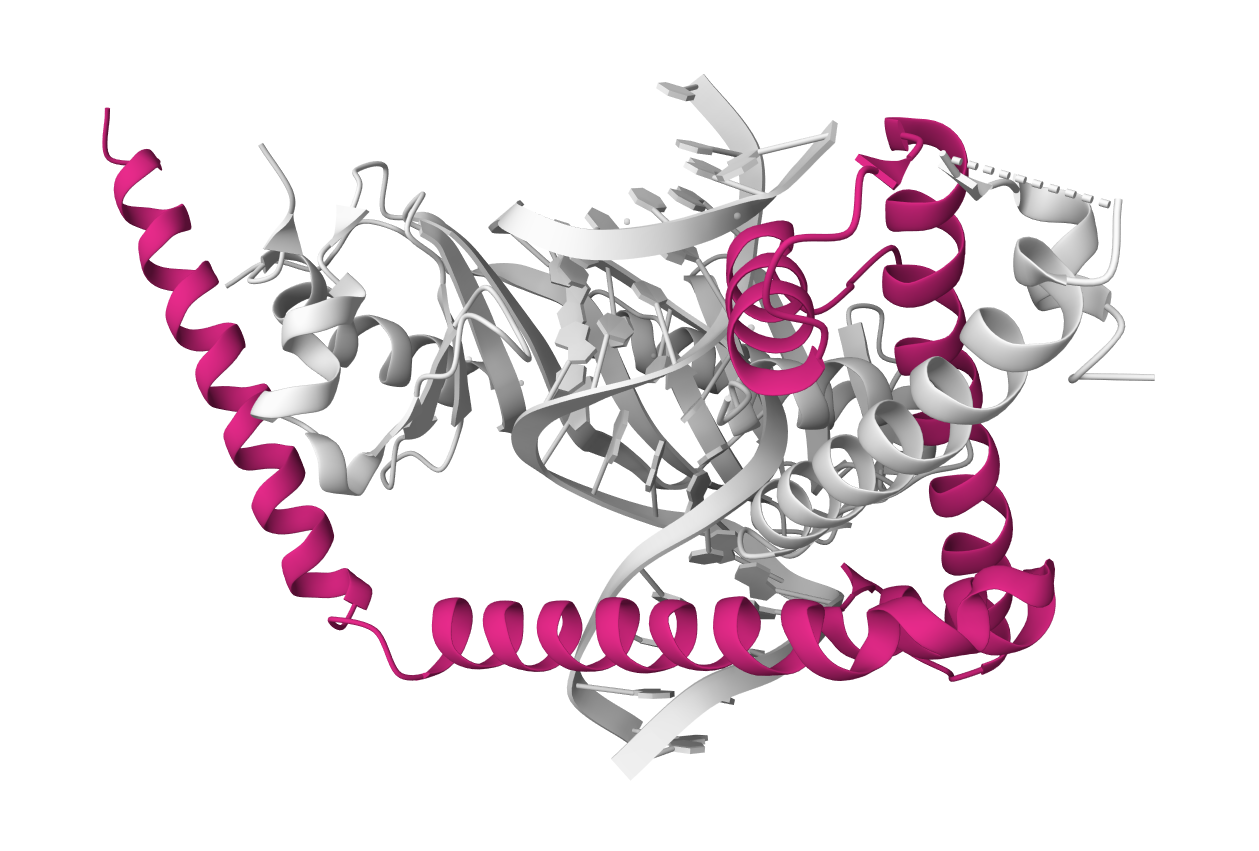

Identifiers
- Aliases: DR1, NC2, NC2-BETA, NC2B, down-regulator of transcription 1, NCB2
- External IDs: OMIM: 601482; MGI: 1100515; GeneCards: DR1
Available structures
PDB	Ortholog search: PDBe RCSB
PDB	List of PDB id codes 1JFI

Gene location (Human)
Chr.	Chromosome 1 (human)
Band	1p22.1	Start	93,345,907 bp
Band	1p22.1	End	93,369,493 bp

Gene location (Mouse)
Chr.	Chromosome 5 (mouse)
Band	5 F|5 52.82 cM	Start	108,416,763 bp
Band	5 F|5 52.82 cM	End	108,428,392 bp
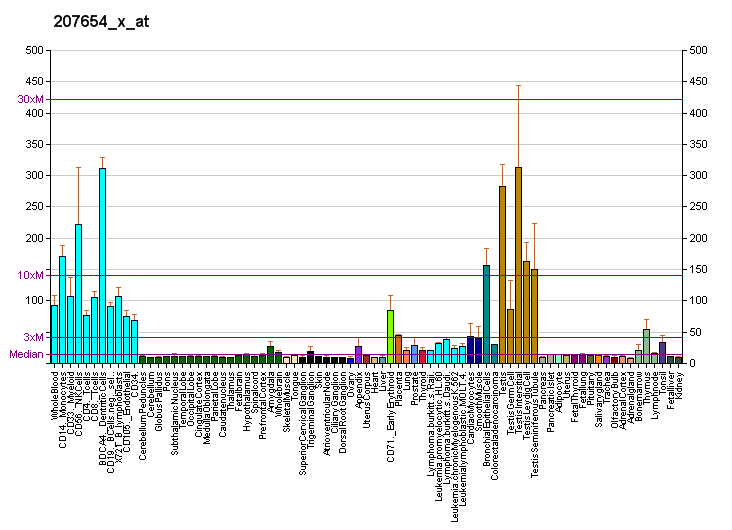

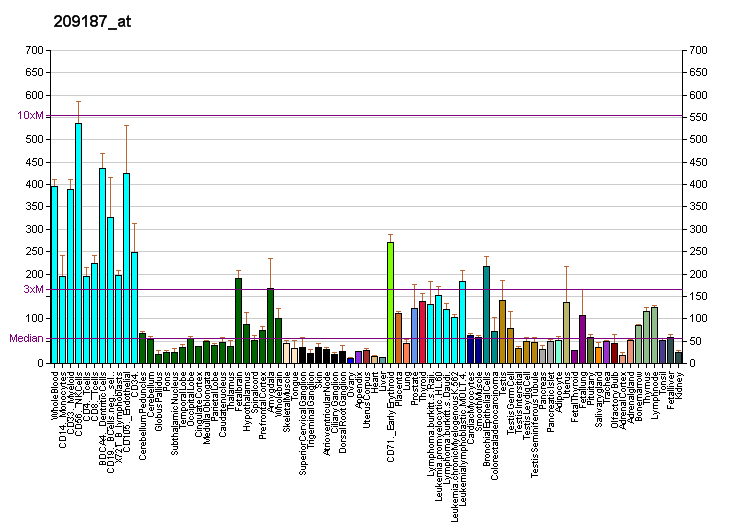

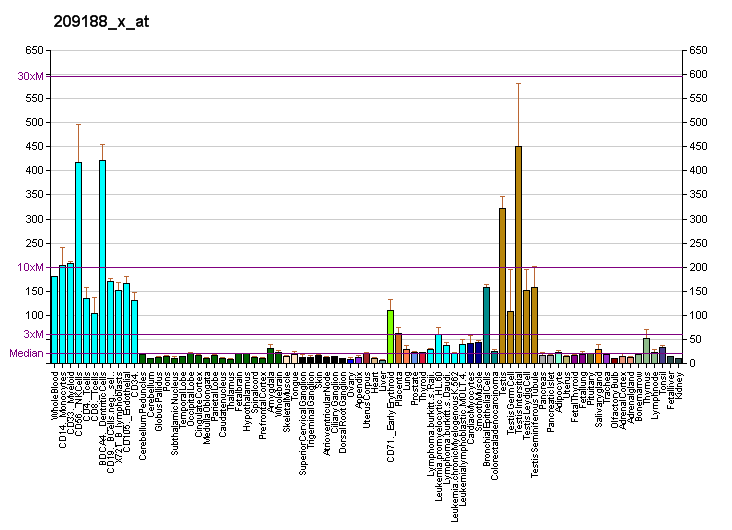
RNA expression pattern
Bgee	Human / Mouse (ortholog); Top expressed in: Epithelium of choroid plexus; human penis; Skeletal muscle tissue of biceps brachii; amniotic fluid; buccal mucosa cell; Skeletal muscle tissue of rectus abdominis; skin of thigh; tibia; body of tongue; oral cavity / Top expressed in: spermatocyte; Gonadal ridge; barrel cortex; seminiferous tubule; Paneth cell; migratory enteric neural crest cell; submandibular gland; primitive streak; atrioventricular valve; hair follicle; More reference expression data
BioGPS	More reference expression data
Gene ontology
Molecular function	TBP-class protein binding; DNA binding; transcription factor binding; protein binding; transcription corepressor activity; protein heterodimerization activity; DNA-binding transcription factor activity, RNA polymerase II-specific; transcription coactivator activity; RNA polymerase II general transcription initiation factor activity
Cellular component	nucleus; negative cofactor 2 complex
Biological process	regulation of transcription, DNA-templated; negative regulation of transcription by RNA polymerase II; histone H3 acetylation; transcription, DNA-templated; chromatin remodeling; regulation of RNA polymerase II transcription preinitiation complex assembly; positive regulation of transcription by RNA polymerase II; RNA polymerase II preinitiation complex assembly; transcription by RNA polymerase II
Sources:Amigo / QuickGO
Orthologs
Databases	NCBI: entry; OMA: entry
Species	Human	Mouse
Entrez	1810	13486
Ensembl	ENSG00000117505	ENSMUSG00000029265
UniProt	Q01658	Q91WV0
RefSeq (mRNA)	NM_001938	NM_026106
RefSeq (protein)	NP_001929	NP_080382
Location (UCSC)	Chr 1: 93.35 – 93.37 Mb	Chr 5: 108.42 – 108.43 Mb
PubMed search
- Wikidata
View/Edit Human	View/Edit Mouse

The DR1 gene is a gene in humans that codes for the Dr1 protein.

== Function ==
This gene encodes a TBP- (TATA box-binding protein) associated phosphoprotein that represses both basal and activated levels of transcription. The encoded protein is phosphorylated in vivo and this phosphorylation affects its interaction with TBP. This protein contains a histone fold motif at the amino terminus, a TBP-binding domain, and a glutamine- and alanine-rich region. The binding of DR1 repressor complexes to TBP-promoter complexes may establish a mechanism in which an altered DNA conformation, together with the formation of higher order complexes, inhibits the assembly of the preinitiation complex and controls the rate of RNA polymerase II transcription.

== Interactions ==
DR1 (gene) has been shown to interact with DRAP1.
