= FOXJ1 =

Protein-coding gene in the species Homo sapiens

Identifiers
- Aliases: FOXJ1, FKHL13, HFH-4, HFH4, forkhead box J1, CILD43
- External IDs: OMIM: 602291; MGI: 1347474; GeneCards: FOXJ1

Gene location (Human)
Chr.	Chromosome 17 (human)
Band	17q25.1	Start	76,136,333 bp
Band	17q25.1	End	76,141,245 bp

Gene location (Mouse)
Chr.	Chromosome 11 (mouse)
Band	11 E2|11 81.16 cM	Start	116,221,530 bp
Band	11 E2|11 81.16 cM	End	116,226,225 bp
RNA expression pattern
Bgee	Human / Mouse (ortholog); Top expressed in: right uterine tube; olfactory zone of nasal mucosa; epithelium of bronchus; bronchial epithelial cell; nasal epithelium; mucosa of paranasal sinus; testicle; ventricular zone; epithelium of nasopharynx; trachea / Top expressed in: choroid plexus of fourth ventricle; spermatid; Epithelium of choroid plexus; embryonic organizer; seminiferous tubule; respiratory epithelium; nasal epithelium; olfactory epithelium; choroid plexus of lateral ventricle; right lung lobe; More reference expression data
BioGPS	n/a
Gene ontology
Molecular function	transcription cis-regulatory region binding; RNA polymerase II cis-regulatory region sequence-specific DNA binding; sequence-specific DNA binding; DNA binding; DNA-binding transcription factor activity; protein binding; DNA-binding transcription activator activity, RNA polymerase II-specific; DNA-binding transcription factor activity, RNA polymerase II-specific
Cellular component	nucleus
Biological process	determination of left/right symmetry; positive regulation of lung ciliated cell differentiation; cell projection organization; regulation of transcription, DNA-templated; metanephric part of ureteric bud development; pattern specification process; transcription, DNA-templated; glomerular parietal epithelial cell development; regulation of epithelial cell differentiation; transcription by RNA polymerase II; negative regulation of T cell proliferation; left/right pattern formation; spermatogenesis; development of the heart; negative regulation of T cell differentiation in thymus; cilium assembly; establishment of apical/basal cell polarity; activation of GTPase activity; negative regulation of B cell activation; positive regulation of central B cell tolerance induction; negative regulation of transcription by RNA polymerase II; epithelium development; negative regulation of humoral immune response mediated by circulating immunoglobulin; brain development; humoral immune response; negative regulation of germinal center formation; central tolerance induction; negative regulation of NF-kappaB transcription factor activity; lung epithelium development; actin cytoskeleton organization; leukocyte migration; positive regulation of transcription by RNA polymerase II; motile cilium assembly; positive regulation of transcription, DNA-templated
Sources:Amigo / QuickGO
Orthologs
Databases	NCBI: entry; OMA: entry
Species	Human	Mouse
Entrez	2302	15223
Ensembl	ENSG00000129654	ENSMUSG00000034227
UniProt	Q92949	Q61660
RefSeq (mRNA)	NM_001454	NM_008240
RefSeq (protein)	NP_001445	NP_032266
Location (UCSC)	Chr 17: 76.14 – 76.14 Mb	Chr 11: 116.22 – 116.23 Mb
PubMed search
- Wikidata
View/Edit Human	View/Edit Mouse

Forkhead box protein J1 is a protein that in humans is encoded by the FOXJ1 gene. It is a member of the Forkhead/winged helix (FOX) family of transcription factors that is involved in ciliogenesis. FOXJ1 is expressed in ciliated cells of the lung, choroid plexus, reproductive tract, embryonic kidney and pre-somite embryo stage.

== Gene Location ==
The human FOXJ1 gene is located on the long arm of chromosome 17, region 2, band 5, sub-band 1.

== Structure ==
FOXJ1 has a conserved 100 amino acid long DNA binding domain.

== Function ==
This gene encodes a member of the forkhead family of transcription factors. Similar genes in zebrafish and mouse have been shown to regulate the transcription of genes that control the production of motile cilia. The mouse ortholog also functions in the determination of left-right asymmetry.

=== Ciliogenesis ===
Primary ciliogenesis is FOXJ1 dependent and this transcription factor is required for motile ciliated cell differentiation. The onset of FOXJ1 expression is indicative of cells fated to become motile ciliated cells. Cells commit towards ciliogenesis prior to FOXJ1 activation. Activation promotes basal body trafficking, docking at the apical membrane and subsequent axoneme growth. The protein p73 a member of the p53 protein family directly regulates FOXJ1 and is a requirement for ciliated cell formation. The 10,000bp long transcription start site of FOXJ1 features three sequence specific binding sites for p73.

=== Immune system ===
In mammalian cells, FOXJ1 has been shown to suppress NFκB, a key regulator in the immune response and also inhibits the humoral response in B-cells. This occurs via regulation of an inhibitory component of NFκB called IκBβ and IL-6.

=== Development ===
FOXJ1 is expressed at various points during embryonic development in relation to teeth germination, enamel, oral and tongue epithelium formation, and formation of sub-mandibular salivary glands and hair follicles. Absence of FOXJ1 expression decreases calpastatin, an inhibitor of the protease calpain. Calpain dysregulation affects basal body anchoring to the apical cytoskeleton affecting axonemal formation. Expression of FOXJ1 is inhibited by IL-13.

== Clinical significance ==
Polymorphisms in this gene are associated with systemic lupus erythematosus and allergic rhinitis.

Viral infections of the respiratory system have been found to lower the expression of FOXJ1. This affects ciliogenesis and impacts mucociliary action.

=== Breast cancer ===
Studies into human breast tissue lines and primary breast tumors have observed that the gene FOXJ1 are aberrantly hypermethylated in primary tumors. This hypermethylation serves to silence production of the FOXJ1 protein and has been proposed as a potentially important event in tumor formation.

=== Clear renal cell carcinoma ===
FOXJ1 expression has been shown to be elevated in clear cell renal carcinoma patients and indicative of tumor stage, histological grade and tumor size. High expression of FOXJ1 in CRCC patients was associated with poor prognosis. There is potential for FOXJ1 to act as an oncogene marker for CRCC patients and has value as a therapeutic target.

=== Axenfeld–Rieger syndrome ===
Axenfeld–Rieger syndrome patients have a point mutation in PITX2 a regulatory protein of the FOXJ1 gene. PITX2 alongside LEF-1 and β-Catenin regulate FOXJ1. FOXJ1 in turn interacts with PITX2 to form a positive feedback mechanism. In the PITX2 point mutant whilst able to bind with FOXJ1 lacks the ability to activate the FOXJ1 promoter, this results in improper oro-facial morphogenesis a factor in ARS.

=== Hydrocephalus ===
Mutations in this gene have been associated with an autosomal dominant syndrome that includes hydrocephalus and randomization of left/right body asymmetry.,
