= FOXF2 =

Protein-coding gene in the species Homo sapiens

Identifiers
- Aliases: FOXF2, FKHL6, FREAC-2, FREAC2, forkhead box F2
- External IDs: OMIM: 603250; MGI: 1347479; GeneCards: FOXF2

Gene location (Human)
Chr.	Chromosome 6 (human)
Band	6p25.3	Start	1,389,576 bp
Band	6p25.3	End	1,395,603 bp

Gene location (Mouse)
Chr.	Chromosome 13 (mouse)
Band	13|13 A3.2	Start	31,809,799 bp
Band	13|13 A3.2	End	31,815,386 bp
RNA expression pattern
Bgee	Human / Mouse (ortholog); Top expressed in: periodontal fiber; urethra; gastric mucosa; lower lobe of lung; pylorus; muscle layer of sigmoid colon; gonad; right lung; mucosa of ileum; transverse colon / Top expressed in: molar; left lung lobe; sclerotome; tongue; mandibular prominence; finger; urethra; genital tubercle; Hindgut; migratory enteric neural crest cell; More reference expression data
BioGPS	n/a
Gene ontology
Molecular function	sequence-specific DNA binding; RNA polymerase II transcription regulatory region sequence-specific DNA binding; DNA-binding transcription activator activity, RNA polymerase II-specific; transcription factor activity, RNA polymerase II distal enhancer sequence-specific binding; DNA-binding transcription factor activity; DNA binding; transcription factor binding; DNA-binding transcription factor activity, RNA polymerase II-specific; protein binding
Cellular component	transcription regulator complex; nucleus
Biological process	transcription, DNA-templated; genitalia development; positive regulation of transcription, DNA-templated; roof of mouth development; regulation of transcription, DNA-templated; positive regulation of transcription by RNA polymerase II; epithelial to mesenchymal transition; transcription by RNA polymerase II; anatomical structure morphogenesis; cell differentiation; extracellular matrix organization; establishment of planar polarity of embryonic epithelium; negative regulation of transcription, DNA-templated; embryonic digestive tract development; embryonic camera-type eye morphogenesis; protein polyubiquitination; proteasome-mediated ubiquitin-dependent protein catabolic process; regulation of proteasomal ubiquitin-dependent protein catabolic process; regulation of protein polyubiquitination
Sources:Amigo / QuickGO
Orthologs
Databases	NCBI: entry; OMA: entry
Species	Human	Mouse
Entrez	2295	14238
Ensembl	ENSG00000137273	ENSMUSG00000038402
UniProt	Q12947	O54743
RefSeq (mRNA)	NM_001452	NM_010225
RefSeq (protein)	NP_001443	NP_034355
Location (UCSC)	Chr 6: 1.39 – 1.4 Mb	Chr 13: 31.81 – 31.82 Mb
PubMed search
- Wikidata
View/Edit Human	View/Edit Mouse

Forkhead box protein F2 is a protein that in humans is encoded by the FOXF2 gene.

== Location ==
The FOXF2 gene is on the short arm of chromosome 6 at position 24.

== Function ==
The FOXF2 gene belongs to the forkhead family, also known as FOX proteins, which is a family of transcription factors characterized by a distinct forkhead domain. FOXF2 helps regulate several pulmonary genes, and is expressed in the lungs and placenta.
