= FOXI1 =

Protein-coding gene in the species Homo sapiens

Identifiers
- Aliases: FOXI1, FKH10, FKHL10, FREAC-6, FREAC6, HFH-3, HFH3, forkhead box I1
- External IDs: OMIM: 601093; MGI: 1096329; GeneCards: FOXI1

Gene location (Human)
Chr.	Chromosome 5 (human)
Band	5q35.1	Start	170,105,897 bp
Band	5q35.1	End	170,109,734 bp

Gene location (Mouse)
Chr.	Chromosome 11 (mouse)
Band	11 A4|11 19.65 cM	Start	34,154,338 bp
Band	11 A4|11 19.65 cM	End	34,158,089 bp
RNA expression pattern
Bgee	Human / Mouse (ortholog); Top expressed in: human kidney; olfactory zone of nasal mucosa; minor salivary glands; skin of leg; renal medulla; skin of abdomen; tonsil; mucosa of transverse colon; mammary gland; lactiferous gland / Top expressed in: humerus; Meckel's cartilage; right kidney; connecting tubule; sphenoid bone; submandibular gland; basisphenoid; rib; human kidney; basilar part of occipital bone; More reference expression data
BioGPS	n/a
Gene ontology
Molecular function	DNA-binding transcription factor activity; RNA polymerase II cis-regulatory region sequence-specific DNA binding; sequence-specific DNA binding; DNA binding; DNA-binding transcription activator activity, RNA polymerase II-specific; DNA binding, bending; DNA-binding transcription factor activity, RNA polymerase II-specific
Cellular component	nucleus; nucleolus; intracellular membrane-bounded organelle
Biological process	positive regulation of transcription, DNA-templated; regulation of transcription, DNA-templated; inner ear morphogenesis; transcription, DNA-templated; positive regulation of transcription by RNA polymerase II; transcription by RNA polymerase II; anatomical structure morphogenesis; cell differentiation; embryo development ending in birth or egg hatching; regulation of transcription by RNA polymerase II
Sources:Amigo / QuickGO
Orthologs
Databases	NCBI: entry; OMA: entry
Species	Human	Mouse
Entrez	2299	14233
Ensembl	ENSG00000168269	ENSMUSG00000047861
UniProt	Q12951	Q922I5
RefSeq (mRNA)	NM_012188; NM_144769	NM_023907
RefSeq (protein)	NP_036320; NP_658982	NP_076396
Location (UCSC)	Chr 5: 170.11 – 170.11 Mb	Chr 11: 34.15 – 34.16 Mb
PubMed search
- Wikidata
View/Edit Human	View/Edit Mouse

Forkhead box I1 is a protein that in humans is encoded by the FOXI1 gene.

This gene belongs to the forkhead family of transcription factors which is characterized by a distinct forkhead domain. The specific function of this gene has not yet been determined; however, it is possible that this gene plays an important role in the development of the cochlea and vestibulum, as well as embryogenesis. Two transcript variants encoding different isoforms have been found for this gene.

== Clinical significance ==
Mutations in this gene are associated with enlarged vestibular aqueduct.

== See also ==
- FOX proteins
