= FOXP1 =

Protein-coding gene in the species Homo sapiens

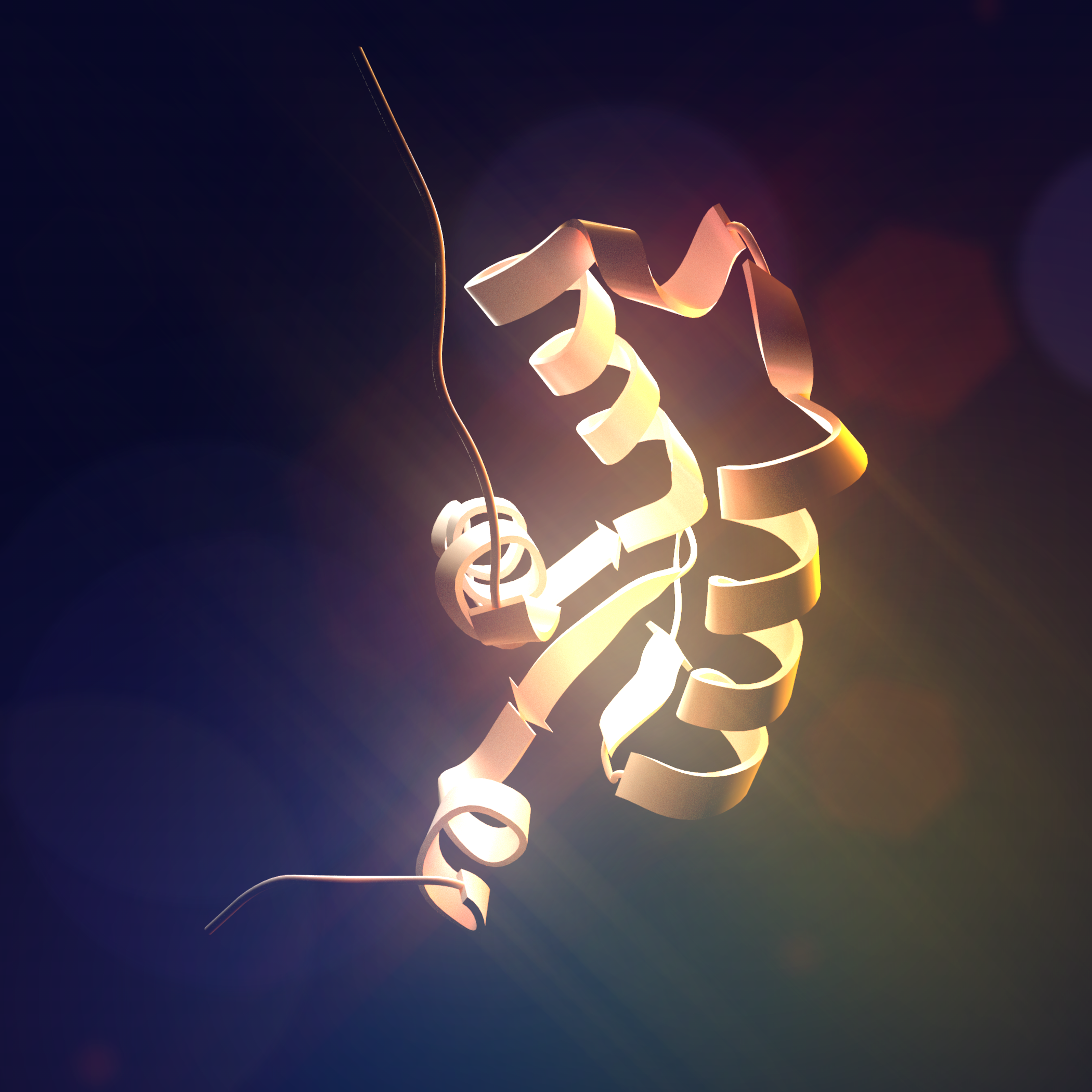

Identifiers
- Aliases: FOXP1, 12CC4, HSPC215, MFH, QRF1, hFKH1B, forkhead box P1
- External IDs: OMIM: 605515; GeneCards: FOXP1
Available structures
PDB	Human UniProt search: PDBe RCSB
PDB	List of PDB id codes 2KIU

Gene location (Human)
Chr.	Chromosome 3 (human)
Band	3p13	Start	70,954,693 bp
Band	3p13	End	71,583,978 bp
RNA expression pattern
Bgee	Human / Mouse (ortholog); Top expressed in: pancreatic ductal cell; cardia; saphenous vein; pylorus; mucosa of ileum; pericardium; urethra; buccal mucosa cell; epithelium of lactiferous gland; lactiferous duct / n/a; More reference expression data
BioGPS	n/a
Gene ontology
Molecular function	metal ion binding; sequence-specific DNA binding; protein self-association; androgen receptor binding; DNA-binding transcription factor activity; DNA binding; protein binding; identical protein binding; DNA-binding transcription factor activity, RNA polymerase II-specific; RNA polymerase II cis-regulatory region sequence-specific DNA binding; chromatin binding; transcription factor activity, RNA polymerase II distal enhancer sequence-specific binding; transcription factor binding; protein homodimerization activity; protein heterodimerization activity
Cellular component	nucleus; nucleoplasm; cytoplasm
Biological process	regulation of monocyte differentiation; negative regulation of androgen receptor signaling pathway; negative regulation of B cell apoptotic process; positive regulation of endothelial cell migration; transcription, DNA-templated; response to lipopolysaccharide; regulation of defense response to bacterium; endothelial cell activation; regulation of endothelial tube morphogenesis; macrophage activation; osteoclast development; positive regulation of smooth muscle cell proliferation; T follicular helper cell differentiation; regulation of macrophage colony-stimulating factor production; regulation of tumor necrosis factor production; regulation of inflammatory response; osteoclast differentiation; monocyte activation; regulation of transcription, DNA-templated; negative regulation of transcription, DNA-templated; regulation of transcription by RNA polymerase II; somatic stem cell population maintenance; negative regulation of transcription by RNA polymerase II; in utero embryonic development; positive regulation of mesenchymal cell proliferation; pre-B cell differentiation; positive regulation of immunoglobulin production; development of the heart; skeletal muscle tissue development; motor neuron axon guidance; ventral spinal cord development; striatum development; lung development; forebrain development; immunoglobulin V(D)J recombination; response to testosterone; sarcomere organization; positive regulation of transcription, DNA-templated; positive regulation of transcription by RNA polymerase II; smooth muscle tissue development; positive regulation of epithelial cell proliferation; cardiac muscle cell differentiation; regulation of cardiac muscle cell proliferation; negative regulation of cell growth involved in cardiac muscle cell development; lung secretory cell differentiation; cellular response to tumor necrosis factor; innate vocalization behavior; regulation of action potential; regulation of lung goblet cell differentiation; negative regulation of lung goblet cell differentiation; cellular response to ionomycin; positive regulation of hydrogen peroxide-induced cell death; positive regulation of cardiac muscle cell differentiation; cellular response to DNA damage stimulus; negative regulation of gene expression; positive regulation of B cell receptor signaling pathway
Sources:Amigo / QuickGO
Orthologs
Databases	NCBI: entry; OMA: entry
Species	Human	Mouse
Entrez	27086	n/a
Ensembl	ENSG00000114861	n/a
UniProt	Q9H334	n/a
RefSeq (mRNA)	NM_001012505; NM_001244808; NM_001244810; NM_001244812; NM_001244813 NM_001244814; NM_001244815; NM_001244816; NM_032682; NM_001349338; NM_001349340; NM_001349341; NM_001349342; NM_001349343; NM_001349344; NM_001349337; NM_001370548	n/a
RefSeq (protein)	NP_001012523; NP_001231737; NP_001231739; NP_001231741; NP_001231742 NP_001231743; NP_001231744; NP_001231745; NP_116071; NP_001336267; NP_001336269; NP_001336270; NP_001336271; NP_001336272; NP_001336273; NP_001336266	n/a
Location (UCSC)	Chr 3: 70.95 – 71.58 Mb	n/a
PubMed search		n/a
- Wikidata
View/Edit Human

Forkhead box protein P1 is a protein that in humans is encoded by the FOXP1 gene. FOXP1 is necessary for the proper development of the brain, heart, and lung in mammals. It is a member of the large FOX family of transcription factors.

== Function ==
This gene belongs to subfamily P of the forkhead box (FOX) transcription factor family. Forkhead box transcription factors play important roles in the regulation of tissue- and cell type-specific gene transcription during both development and adulthood. Forkhead box P1 protein contains both DNA-binding- and protein-protein binding-domains. This gene may act as a tumor suppressor as it is lost in several tumor types and maps to a chromosomal region (3p14.1) reported to contain a tumor suppressor gene(s). Alternative splicing results in multiple transcript variants encoding different isoforms.

FOXP1 is a transcription factor; specifically it is a transcriptional repressor. FOX genes are part of a forkhead DNA-binding domain family. This domain binds to sequences in promoters and enhancers of many genes. FOXP1 regulates a variety of important aspects of development including tissue development of: the lungs, brain, thymus and heart. In the heart FOXP1 has three vital roles, these include the regulation of cardiac myocyte maturation and proliferation, outflow tract separation of the pulmonary artery and aorta, and expression of Sox4 in cushions and myocardium. FOXP1 is also an important gene in muscle development of the esophagus and esophageal epithelium. FOXP1 is also an important regulator of lung airway morphogenesis. FOXP1 knockout embryos display severe defects in cardiac morphogenesis. A few of these defects include myocyte maturation and proliferation defects that cause a thin ventricular myocardial compact zone, non-separation of the pulmonary artery and aorta, and cardiomyocyte proliferation increase and defective differentiation. These defects, caused by FOXP1 inactivation, lead to fetal death. Disruptions of FOXP1 have been identified in very rare human patients and – similarly to FOXP2 – lead to cognitive dysfunction, including intellectual disability and autism spectrum disorder, together with language impairment.

It was shown that the embryonic stem cell (ESC)-specific isoform of FOXP1 stimulates the expression of transcription factor genes required for pluripotency, including OCT4, NANOG, NR5A2, and GDF3, while concomitantly repressing genes required for ESC differentiation. This isoform also promotes the maintenance of ESC pluripotency and contributes to efficient reprogramming of somatic cells into induced pluripotent stem cells. These results reveal a pivotal role for an Alternative splicing event in the regulation of pluripotency through the control of critical ESC-specific transcriptional programs.

== See also ==
- FOXP2
- FOXP3
