= FOXH1 =

Protein-coding gene in the species Homo sapiens

Identifiers
- Aliases: FOXH1, FAST-1, FAST1, forkhead box H1
- External IDs: OMIM: 603621; MGI: 1347465; GeneCards: FOXH1

Gene location (Human)
| Chr. | Chromosome 8 (human) |
| Band | 8q24.3 | Start | 144,473,412 bp |
| Band | 8q24.3 | End | 144,475,849 bp |

Gene location (Mouse)
| Chr. | Chromosome 15 (mouse) |
| Band | 15|15 D3 | Start | 76,552,425 bp |
| Band | 15|15 D3 | End | 76,554,148 bp |
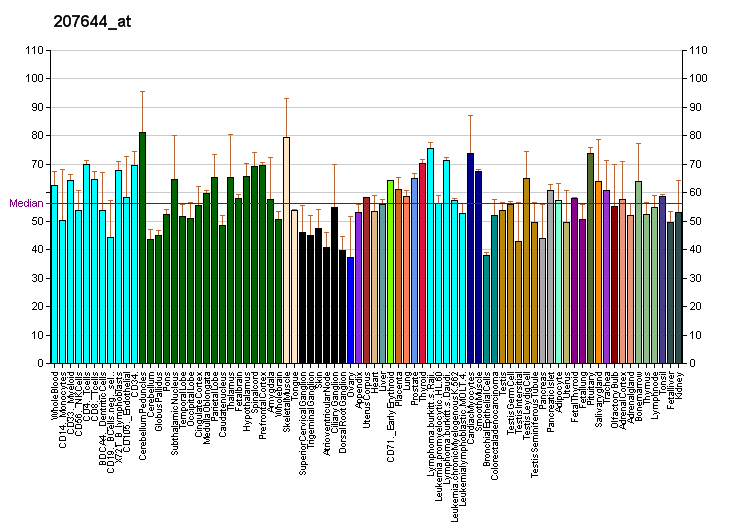
RNA expression pattern
| Bgee | Human / Mouse (ortholog); Top expressed in: testicle; gonad; mucosa of transverse colon; islet of Langerhans; middle temporal gyrus; rectum; mucosa of nose; duodenum; nucleus accumbens; occipital lobe / Top expressed in: epiblast; embryo; lumbar spinal ganglion; embryo; blastocyst; primitive endoderm; primitive streak; spermatid; morula; spermatocyte; More reference expression data |
| BioGPS | More reference expression data |
Gene ontology
| Molecular function | co-SMAD binding; transcription coregulator activity; protein domain specific binding; sequence-specific DNA binding; DNA-binding transcription activator activity, RNA polymerase II-specific; androgen receptor binding; DNA-binding transcription factor activity; bHLH transcription factor binding; DNA binding; protein binding; R-SMAD binding; SMAD binding; transcription factor activity, RNA polymerase II distal enhancer sequence-specific binding; DNA-binding transcription factor activity, RNA polymerase II-specific |
| Cellular component | nucleoplasm; activin responsive factor complex; transcription regulator complex; nucleus |
| Biological process | ventricular trabecula myocardium morphogenesis; anterior/posterior pattern specification; negative regulation of androgen receptor signaling pathway; embryonic heart tube anterior/posterior pattern specification; transcription, DNA-templated; outflow tract morphogenesis; nodal signaling pathway involved in determination of lateral mesoderm left/right asymmetry; regulation of transcription by RNA polymerase II; heart looping; axial mesoderm development; cardiac right ventricle morphogenesis; negative regulation of transcription by RNA polymerase II; determination of left/right symmetry; secondary heart field specification; positive regulation of transcription, DNA-templated; regulation of transcription, DNA-templated; aorta morphogenesis; transcription by RNA polymerase II; negative regulation of intracellular estrogen receptor signaling pathway; transforming growth factor beta receptor signaling pathway; positive regulation of transcription by RNA polymerase II; cellular response to cytokine stimulus; anatomical structure morphogenesis; cell differentiation; negative regulation of DNA-binding transcription factor activity |
Sources:Amigo / QuickGO
Orthologs
| Databases | NCBI: entry; OMA: entry |
| Species | Human | Mouse |
| Entrez | 8928 | 14106 |
| Ensembl | ENSG00000160973 | ENSMUSG00000033837 |
| UniProt | O75593 | O88621 |
| RefSeq (mRNA) | NM_003923 | NM_007989 |
| RefSeq (protein) | NP_003914 | NP_032015 |
| Location (UCSC) | Chr 8: 144.47 – 144.48 Mb | Chr 15: 76.55 – 76.55 Mb |
| PubMed search |
- Wikidata
| View/Edit Human | View/Edit Mouse |

Forkhead box protein H1 is a protein that in humans is encoded by the FOXH1 gene.

== Function ==
FOXH1 encodes a human homolog of Xenopus forkhead activin signal transducer-1. FOXH1 protein binds SMAD2 and activates an activin response element via binding the DNA motif TGT(G/T)(T/G)ATT.

FoxH1 is a transcription factor that contains a conserved function in chordates. FoxH1, acts in combination with other transcription factors, as a critical element of node formation in early embryo development. Specifically, FoxH1 plays a role in anterior/posterior determination during gastrulation. By the third week of gestation, cells of the splanchnic mesoderm have migrated to the superior end of the embryo to form the cardiac crescent. The cardiac crescent forms two heart fields; primary heart field and the secondary heart field. At this point in development, the two heart fields fuse to form a primitive, single-chambered heart referred to as the primary myocardium. The secondary (anterior) heart field of these cardiac crescent cells will give rise to the outflow tract and the right ventricle of the mature heart. A model lacking FoxH1 will form a primary myocardium, undergo some amount of looping, but have undefined right ventricles and outflow tracts.

== Interactions ==
FOXH1 has been shown to interact with DRAP1 and Mothers against decapentaplegic homolog 2.

== See also ==
- FOX proteins
