= FOXM1 =

Protein-coding gene in humans

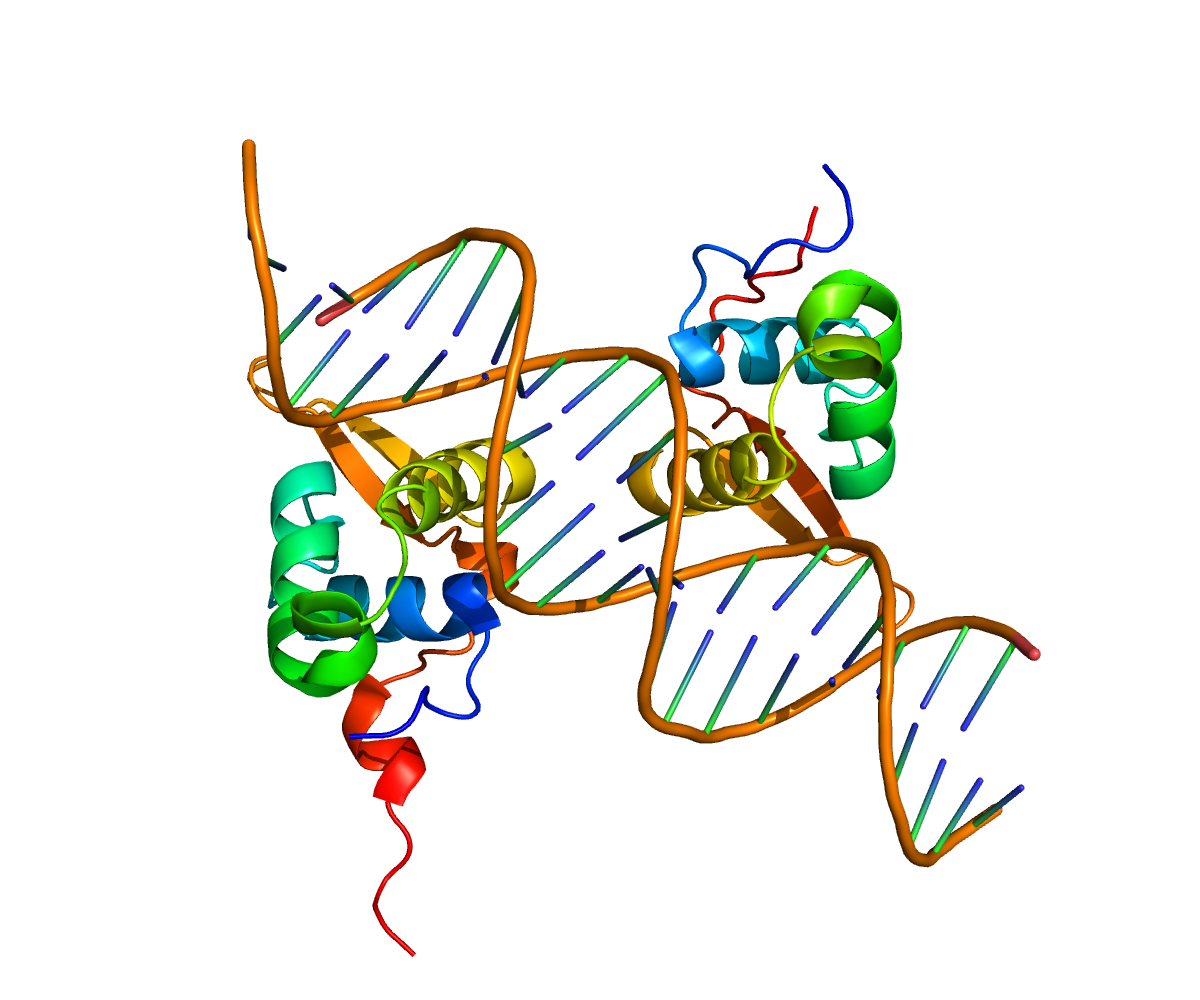

Identifiers
- Aliases: FOXM1, FKHL16, FOXM1B, HFH-11, HFH11, HNF-3, INS-1, MPHOSPH2, MPP-2, MPP2, PIG29, TGT3, TRIDENT, forkhead box M1, FOXM1A, FOXM1C
- External IDs: OMIM: 602341; MGI: 1347487; GeneCards: FOXM1
Available structures
PDB	Ortholog search: PDBe RCSB
PDB	List of PDB id codes 3G73

Gene location (Human)
Chr.	Chromosome 12 (human)
Band	12p13.33	Start	2,857,680 bp
Band	12p13.33	End	2,877,174 bp

Gene location (Mouse)
Chr.	Chromosome 6 (mouse)
Band	6 F3|6 62.98 cM	Start	128,339,930 bp
Band	6 F3|6 62.98 cM	End	128,353,109 bp
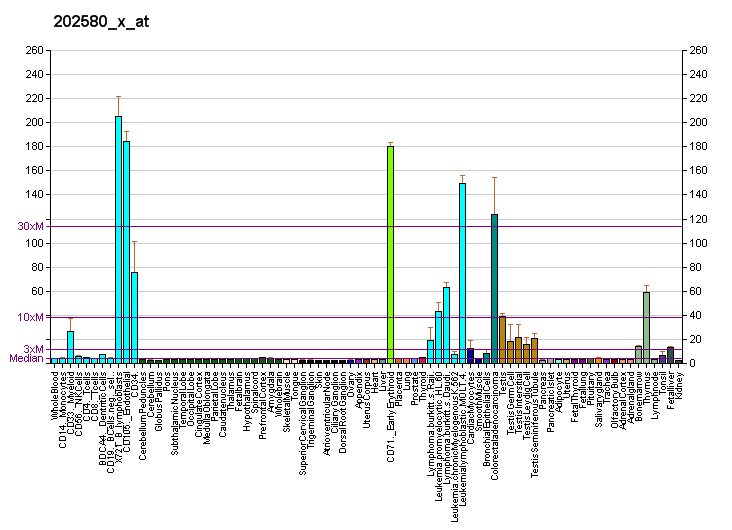
RNA expression pattern
Bgee	Human / Mouse (ortholog); Top expressed in: ventricular zone; ganglionic eminence; gonad; sperm; mucosa of transverse colon; left testis; stromal cell of endometrium; right testis; testicle; rectum / Top expressed in: genital tubercle; tail of embryo; ventricular zone; secondary oocyte; zygote; otic vesicle; primary oocyte; otic placode; yolk sac; seminiferous tubule; More reference expression data
BioGPS	More reference expression data
Gene ontology
Molecular function	DNA binding; sequence-specific DNA binding; DNA-binding transcription factor activity; protein binding; protein kinase binding; RNA polymerase II transcription regulatory region sequence-specific DNA binding; DNA-binding transcription repressor activity, RNA polymerase II-specific; DNA-binding transcription factor activity, RNA polymerase II-specific
Cellular component	nucleus; nucleoplasm
Biological process	positive regulation of double-strand break repair; regulation of Ras protein signal transduction; negative regulation of transcription by RNA polymerase II; regulation of reactive oxygen species metabolic process; transcription by RNA polymerase II; transcription, DNA-templated; regulation of cell cycle; cellular response to DNA damage stimulus; regulation of cell population proliferation; G2/M transition of mitotic cell cycle; regulation of cell growth; positive regulation of cell population proliferation; negative regulation of stress-activated MAPK cascade; negative regulation of transcription, DNA-templated; DNA repair; positive regulation of transcription by RNA polymerase II; DNA damage response, signal transduction by p53 class mediator resulting in transcription of p21 class mediator; regulation of transcription, DNA-templated; anatomical structure morphogenesis; cell differentiation; cell cycle; positive regulation of transcription, DNA-templated
Sources:Amigo / QuickGO
Orthologs
Databases	NCBI: entry; OMA: entry
Species	Human	Mouse
Entrez	2305	14235
Ensembl	ENSG00000111206	ENSMUSG00000001517
UniProt	Q08050	O08696
RefSeq (mRNA)	NM_001243088; NM_001243089; NM_021953; NM_202002; NM_202003	NM_008021
RefSeq (protein)	NP_001230017; NP_001230018; NP_068772; NP_973731; NP_973732	n/a
Location (UCSC)	Chr 12: 2.86 – 2.88 Mb	Chr 6: 128.34 – 128.35 Mb
PubMed search
- Wikidata
View/Edit Human	View/Edit Mouse

Forkhead box protein M1 is a protein that in humans is encoded by the FOXM1 gene. The protein encoded by this gene is a member of the FOX family of transcription factors. Its potential as a target for future cancer treatments led to it being designated the 2010 Molecule of the Year.

== Function ==
FOXM1 is known to play a key role in cell cycle progression where endogenous FOXM1 expression peaks at S and G2/M phases. FOXM1-null mouse embryos were neonatal lethal as a result of the development of polyploid cardiomyocytes and hepatocytes, highlighting the role of FOXM1 in mitotic division. More recently a study using transgenic/knockout mouse embryonic fibroblasts and human osteosarcoma cells (U2OS) has shown that FOXM1 regulates expression of a large array of G2/M-specific genes, such as Plk1, cyclin B2, Nek2 and CENPF, and plays an important role in maintenance of chromosomal segregation and genomic stability.

== Cancer link ==
FOXM1 gene is now known as a human proto-oncogene. Abnormal upregulation of FOXM1 is involved in the oncogenesis of basal cell carcinoma, the most common human cancer worldwide. The upregulation of both FOXM1 and its targets has been found in the majority of solid human cancers including liver, breast, lung, prostate, cervix of uterus, colon, and brain.

== Isoforms ==
There are three FOXM1 isoforms in humans, A, B and C. Isoform FOXM1A has been shown to be a gene transcriptional repressor whereas the remaining isoforms (B and C) are both transcriptional activators. Hence, it is not surprising that FOXM1B and C isoforms have been found to be upregulated in human cancers.

== Mechanism of oncogenesis ==
The exact mechanism of FOXM1 in cancer formation remains unknown. It is thought that upregulation of FOXM1 promotes oncogenesis through abnormal impact on its multiple roles in cell cycle and chromosomal/genomic maintenance. Aberrant upregulation of FOXM1 in primary human skin keratinocytes can directly induce genomic instability in the form of loss of heterozygosity (LOH) and copy number aberrations.

FOXM1 overexpression is involved in early events of carcinogenesis in head and neck squamous cell carcinoma. It has been shown that nicotine exposure directly activates FOXM1 activity in human oral keratinocytes and induced malignant transformation.

== Role in stem cell fate ==
A recent report by the research group which first found that the over-expression of FOXM1 is associated with human cancer, showed that aberrant upregulation of FOXM1 in adult human epithelial stem cells induces a precancer phenotype in a 3D-organotypic tissue regeneration system – a condition similar to human hyperplasia. The authors showed that excessive expression of FOXM1 exploits the inherent self-renewal proliferation potential of stem cells by interfering with the differentiation pathway, thereby expanding the progenitor cell compartment. It was therefore hypothesized that FOXM1 induces cancer initiation through stem/progenitor cell expansion.

== Role in epigenome regulations ==
Given the role in progenitor/stem cells expansion, FOXM1 has been shown to modulate the epigenome. It was found that overexpression of FOXM1 "brain washes" normal cells to adopt cancer-like epigenome. A number of new epigenetic biomarkers influenced by FOXM1 were identified from the study and these were thought to represent epigenetic signature of early cancer development which has potential for early cancer diagnosis and prognosis.

== Interactions ==
FOXM1 has been shown to interact with Cdh1.

== See also ==
- FOX proteins
