= Bamforth–Lazarus syndrome =

- Other names: Athyroidal hypothyroidism-spiky hair-cleft palate syndrome, Bamforth syndrome
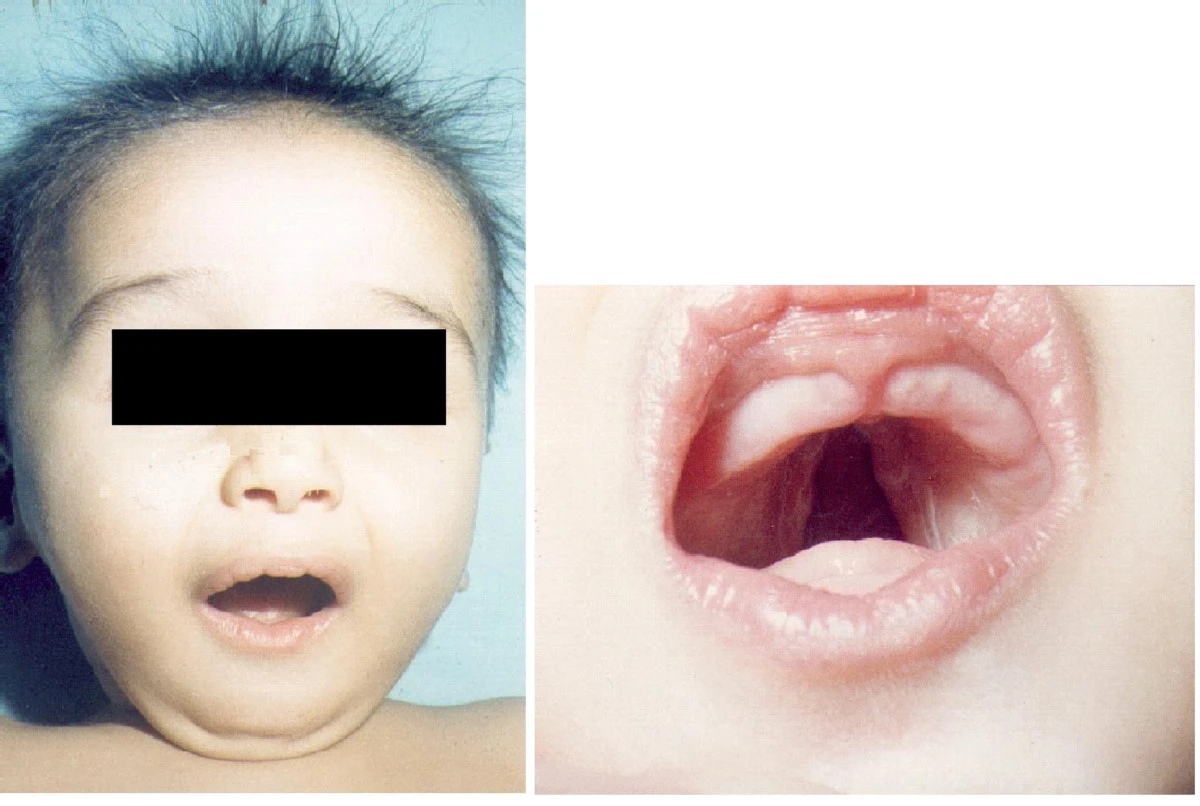
- Illustration shows person with Bamforth-Lazarus syndrome, with extensive cleft palate, hypertelorism, spiky hair and low posterior hairline, and low set ears.
- Specialty: Medical genetics
- Symptoms: Congenital hypothyroidism, cleft palate, spiky hair, choanal atresia, bifid epiglottis
- Usual onset: Present at birth
- Causes: Genetic (autosomal recessive disorder, mutation in FOXE1 gene)
- Treatment: Thyroid hormone replacement therapy
- Prognosis: Good prognosis with treatment

Bamforth–Lazarus syndrome is a rare inherited genetic condition caused by rare variants in the forkhead domain of the FOXE1 gene, which encodes a protein involved in thyroid development. The prevalence of Bamforth–Lazarus syndrome is less than 1 in 1 000 000 people. It follows an autosomal recessive mode of inheritance pattern. The disorder is characterized by congenital hypothyroidism due to thyroid dysgenesis and other symptoms including, cleft palate, spiky or coarse hair, choanal atresia, and occasionally a bifid epiglottis.

Bamforth–Lazarus syndrome was first described in 1989 by the physicians J. S. Bamforth and J. H. Lazarus.

== Signs and symptoms ==
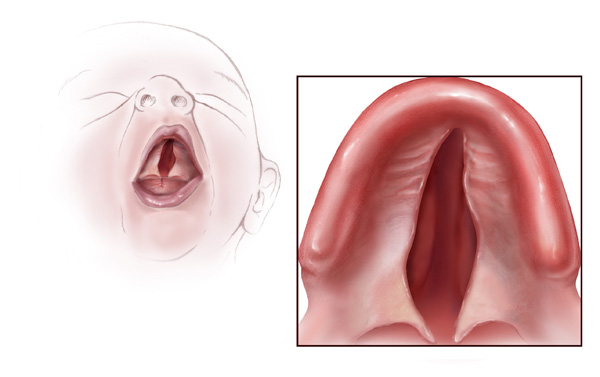
Cleft palate, one of the characteristic craniofacial abnormalities observed in Bamforth–Lazarus syndrome.

The primary feature of Bamforth–Lazarus syndrome is congenital hypothyroidism, which is an endocrine condition in which the thyroid gland fails to produce sufficient levels of thyroid hormones. This is due to the fact that affected individuals often exhibit thyroid dysgenesis, or have an underdeveloped, incorrectly placed, or entirely missing thyroid gland (thyroid agenesis). As thyroid hormones are crucial for regulating metabolism, insufficient levels can impact heart rate, body temperature, and body weight. This can lead to several common symptoms seen in affected individuals, including slow heart rate, severe fatigue, constipation, muscle aches, high sensitivity to cold, and weight gain.

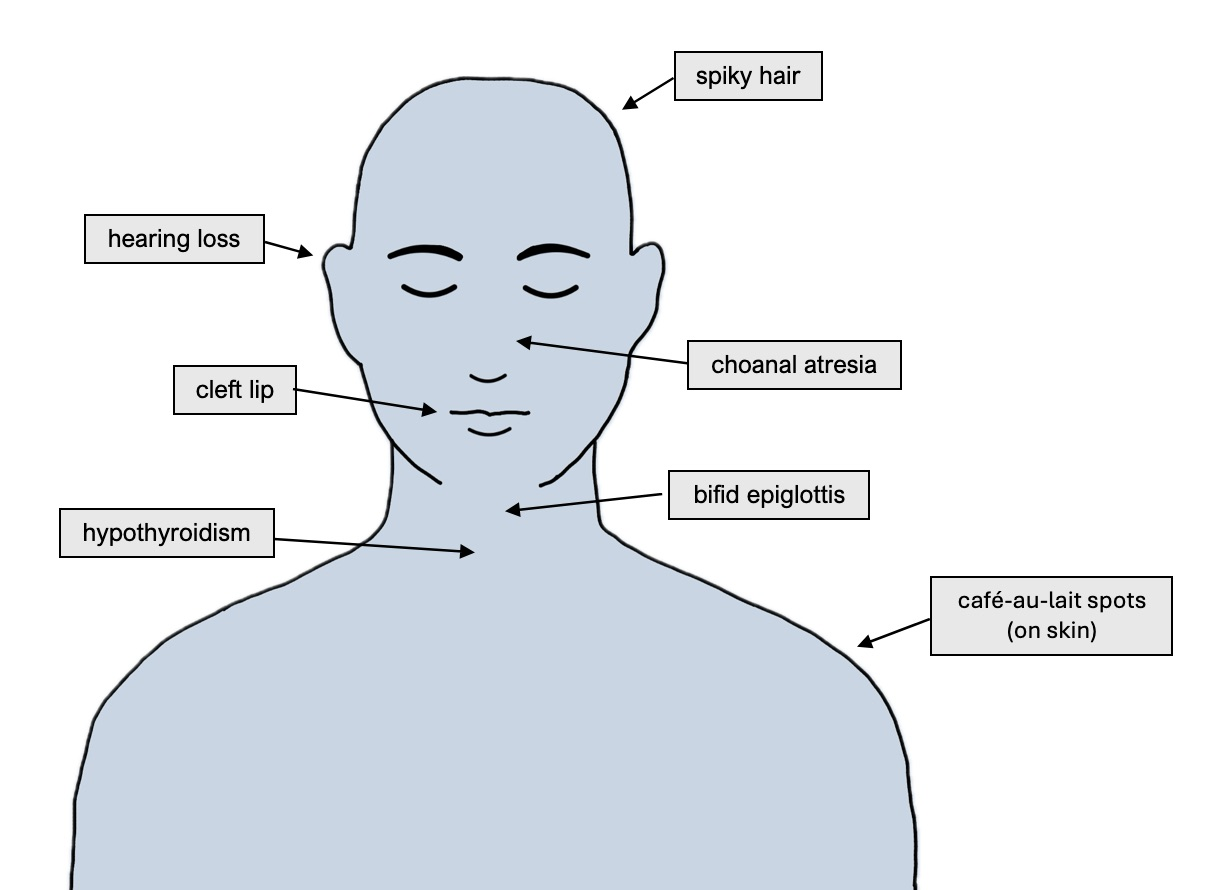
Reported symptoms of patients with Bamforth–Lazarus syndrome

In addition to thyroid abnormalities, some patients also exhibit a range of structural congenital anomalies, such as cleft palate, choanal atresia, which is blockage of the nasal passage by abnormal tissue development, and bifid epiglottis, in which the epiglottis has a midline cleft. Other various reported symptoms include spiky or abnormal scalp hair, small areolae, mild bilateral hearing loss, and the presence of café-au-lait spots (pigmented, brown, flat birthmarks) on the skin.

Patients with Bamforth–Lazarus syndrome are commonly diagnosed at birth or within the first six months of birth as a result of the early presentation of hypothyroidism caused by thyroid dysgenesis as well as the other developmental features. The phenotypes of adolescent and adult patients are not currently well characterized in the medical literature, although, in 1998 two male siblings with Bamforth–Lazarus syndrome, ages 13 and 16, were described as having thus far undergone normal pubertal development and exhibited normal anterior pituitary function at the time of the report. In 2022, an 18-year-old affected male was also reported to have undergone normal pubertal development.

== Genetics ==
Bamforth–Lazarus syndrome is caused by variants in the Forkhead box E1 (FOXE1) gene, also known as Thyroid Transcription Factor 2 (TTF2). FOXE1 is a single-exon gene located on chromosome 9 at the position 9q22.33 in the genome. The gene codes for a 373 amino acid transcription factor, FOXE1, containing a conserved forkhead domain, which binds DNA to help regulate gene expression.

=== Role of FOXE1 gene ===
Bamforth–Lazarus syndrome is inherited in an autosomal recessive pattern.

During prenatal development, FOXE1 has been shown to be expressed in the thyroid, thymus, and oropharyngeal epithelium, while it is expressed in the thyroid, hair follicles, and prepubertal testes postnatally.

FOXE1 is known to bind to promoters and upregulate the expression thyroglobulin (TG) and thyroperoxidase (TPO), which are critical for proper thyroid development and hormone production. FOXE1 also plays an important role in craniofacial development through its regulation of TGF-β3 and MSX1, which are both proteins involved in palate formation.

=== Genetic inheritance ===
Bamforth–Lazarus syndrome is inherited in an autosomal recessive pattern, meaning that an affected individual inherits a pathogenic variant of the gene from each parent, who is typically an unaffected genetic carrier. Any child of two heterozygous parents who carry a pathogenic variant implicated in Bamforth–Lazarus syndrome has a 25 percent of being affected by the condition. Affected individuals have been commonly reported to have consanguinity in their family history.

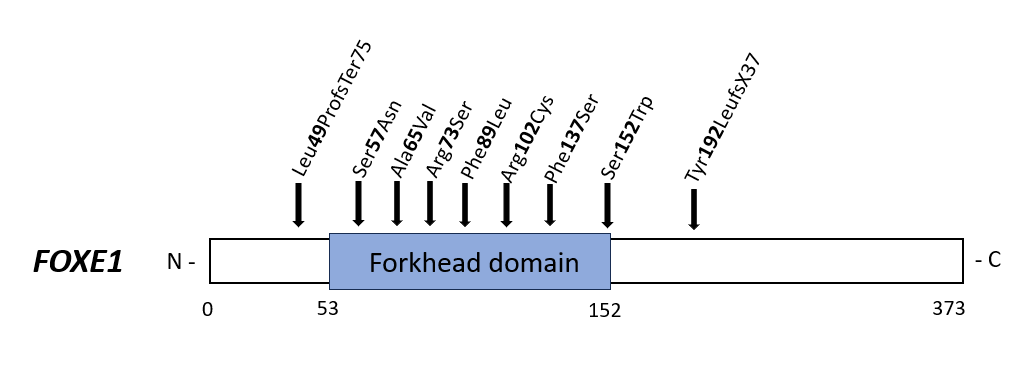
The amino acid sequence of the FOXE1 protein, showing the relative position of the 9 identified pathogenic variants involved in Bamforth-Lazarus syndrome. Note that the forkhead domain is not to scale and the numbers indicate the amino acids.

=== Pathogenic variants ===
Nine different pathogenic variants in the FOXE1 gene have been found in patients with Bamforth–Lazarus syndrome. Of the nine variants, seven are missense variants and two are frameshift variants. Notably, as of 2025, one patient was identified to have inherited different FOXE1 variants from each parent, exhibiting one frameshift variant and one missense variant on their different copies of the gene. In all other reported cases of the disorder, affected patients had inherited two copies of the same pathogenic variant from their parents. Additionally, seven of the variants are located in regions coding for the forkhead DNA-binding domain of FOXE1, which is a 100 amino acid portion of the protein, while two are located outside of the forkhead domain-coding region. These pathogenic variants have been shown to have either loss-of-function or gain-of-function effects on the FOXE1 gene, causing the activity of its forkhead DNA-binding domain to be either irregularly suppressed or enhanced.

List of reported FOXE1 variants and associated phenotypes in Bamforth-Lazarus Syndrome

Variant	variant Type	Reported Phenotype	Reference
p. Leu49ProfsTer75	Frameshift	Congenital hypothyroidism, spiky hair, cleft palate, hearing loss, developmental delay, cardiac findings	Sarma et al., 2022
p.Ser57Asn	Missense	Congenital hypothyroidism, thyroid agenesis, cleft palate	Castanet et al., 2002
p.Ala65Val	Missense	Thyroid agenesis, cleft palate, choanal atresia, bifid epiglottis	Clifton-Bligh et al., 1998, Bamforth et al., 1989
p.Arg102Cys	Missense	Congenital hypothyroidism, small nonfunctional thyroid in normal location, cleft palate	Barış et al., 2006
p.Phe137Ser	Missense	Syndromic congenital hypothyroidism due to maternal isodisomy; typical craniofacial features	Castanet et al., 2010
p.Arg73Ser	Missense	Altered thyroidal gene expression; congenital hypothyroidism with cleft palate	Carré et al., 2014
p.Phe89Leu	Missense	Congenital hypothyroidism, cleft palate;	Al-Araimi et al., 2025
p.Ser152Trp	Missense	Congenital hypothyroidism with craniofacial anomalies	de Filippis et al., 2017
p.Tyr192LeufsX37	Frameshift	Severe congenital hypothyroidism, thyroid dysgenesis	de Filippis et al., 2017

== History ==
Bamforth–Lazarus syndrome was first recognized as genetically determined when it was reported in 1989 by British physicians J. S. Bamforth and J. H. Lazarus. The two Welsh infant brothers studied, born to consanguineous parents, had distinctive symptoms that were unprecedented and different from previous studies of abnormal hair and hypothyroidism where they were able to have normal mental development. They presented with hypothyroidism, spiky scalp hair, cleft palate, choanal atresia, and a bifid epiglottis. In 1993, a female infant was reported by Buntincx and colleagues with similar distinctive characteristics, which revealed that the condition occurs in both sexes and thus is not linked to the X chromosome. Clifton-Bligh et al. in 1998 followed-up the two Welsh brothers and although their spiky hair persisted, with thyroxine therapy they both had normal growth and pubertal development. In the same year, the researchers identified variants in the FOXE1 gene as the genetic cause of thyroid agenesis in Bamforth–Lazarus syndrome.

In the early 2000s, two brothers from Tunisia who were born to consanguineous parents reported by Castanet et al. had congenital hypothyroidism and cleft palate but did not have characteristics of choanal atresia or a bifid epiglottis. This finding was able to demonstrate that the syndrome is able to be presented in variety of severities. A few years later, researchers Barış and colleagues documented a Turkish female patient with similar clinical features and a small, nonfunctional thyroid gland in its normal location, suggesting that thyroid tissue can develop even when TTF2 function is impaired.

In 2010, an unprecedented case of FOXE1 variants of homozygosity from maternal isodisomy was reported by Castanet and colleagues of a German girl with similar characteristics of the syndrome but still followed the pattern of autosomal recessive inheritance. Recently, in 2022, Sarma et al. described an Indian patient with a homozygous frameshift variant in FOXE1 who also exhibited developmental delay, hearing loss, and mild cardiac findings other than the classic clinical symptoms. In 2025, Al-Araimi and colleagues published a paper describing an Omani brother and sister where they were born to consanguineous parents, carried a novel FOXE1 variant.

== Epidemiology ==
Most of the known cases that were categorized as Bamforth–Lazarus syndrome have occurred in consanguineous families and are consistent with an autosomal recessive mode of inheritance pattern. The families reported come from diverse regions such as Europe, Turkey, South Asia. In the United Kingdom, Wales, and Northern Ireland, a population-based screening programs for congenital hypothyroidism, and have provided data on its overall incidence and have made early detection possible where congenital hypothyroidism which affects roughly one in every 3000-4000 newborns. As Bamforth–Lazarus syndrome is a rare genetic condition, it is thought to be only accounted for a small fraction of the cases reported. Another study of congenital hypothyroidism in iodine-sufficient regions suggests that most congenital hypothyroidiam cases (1:3000-4000) arise sporadically or from other developmental defects, while inherited genetic factors such as FOXE1 (TFF2) explain only around two to three percent of the cases reported.

== Diagnosis ==
CT scan of a patient's neck showing an ectopic thyroid (a type of thyroid dysgenesis)

Typically, clinical signs of spiky hair, cleft palate, and congenital hypothyroidism lead to the diagnosis of Bamforth–Lazarus syndrome postnatally. A thyroid ultrasound or computed tomography (CT) scan are also used in the diagnosis to identify thyroid dysgenesis. The thyroid stimulating hormone (TSH) concentration in the blood should also be measured, in order to identify the severity of hypothyroidism in the patient, and determine the appropriate dosage for treatment. The diagnosis can be further confirmed by using DNA sequencing techniques, such as exome sequencing or sanger sequencing, to identify pathogenic variants in the FOXE1 gene.

== Treatment ==
=== Thyroid replacement therapy ===
The standard treatment for Bamforth–Lazarus syndrome is thyroid hormone replacement therapy. Most commonly, synthetic thyroid hormone called levothyroxine (LT4) is administered as an oral pill. This treatment is started immediately after the diagnosis and TSH lab tests, in order to compensate for the low levels of thyroid hormone caused by thyroid dysgenesis. Thyroid hormone replacement therapy is administered throughout the patient's entire life, and they should have regular appointments to monitor the TSH levels in their blood. If the severity of hypothyroidism gets progressively worse, the dosage of levothyroxine may be increased over time.

=== Surgery and other interventions ===
Treatments for Bamforth–Lazarus syndrome are personalized because the symptoms vary between patients. For example, if the patient has choanal atresia, surgery may be recommend in order to remove nasal blockage and improve the patient's ability to breathe. Children with a cleft palate may require surgery such as maxillofacial reconstruction, when they are between 6–8 months old. They may also require undergoing speech therapy.

=== Support and resources ===
As of 2025, There are no organizations supporting Bamforth–Lazarus syndrome due to its rarity. Therefore, typically, individuals and families will be provided support through broader groups for information and patient-centred services such as congenital hypothyroidism, cleft palate, and other rare disease organizations. Patients may have access to broader infrastructures, such as expert centres, networks of expert centres, listed diagnostic tests, patient organizations, federations or alliances, and [[genetic counselling|Genetic counselling]] services. Specifically rare disease organizations like the Genetic and Rare Diseases Information Center of the National Center for Advancing Translational Sciences (GARD) and the National Organization for Rare Disorders (NORD) are frequently used by affected families. The resources will be able to guide and provide pathways to specialized care and peer networks.

== Prognosis ==
If hypothyroidism is treated soon after birth, children with Bamforth–Lazarus syndrome can have normal intellectual development and physical growth, and an overall good prognosis. However, even with proper treatment, some children with severe thyroid dysgenesis show subtle signs of deficits in memory, attention, motor development, or verbal skills.
