= FOXE1 =

Mammalian protein found in Homo sapiens

Identifiers
- Aliases: FOXE1, FKHL15, FOXE2, HFKH4, HFKL5, TITF2, TTF-2, TTF2, NMTC4, forkhead box E1
- External IDs: OMIM: 602617; MGI: 1353500; GeneCards: FOXE1

Gene location (Human)
Chr.	Chromosome 9 (human)
Band	9q22.33	Start	97,853,226 bp
Band	9q22.33	End	97,856,717 bp
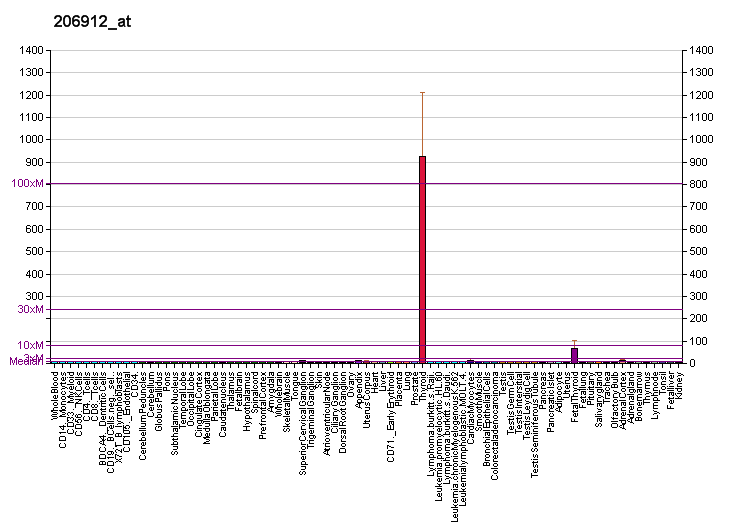
RNA expression pattern
Bgee	Human / Mouse (ortholog); Top expressed in: right lobe of thyroid gland; left lobe of thyroid gland; gingival epithelium; epithelium of nasopharynx; oral cavity; amniotic fluid; mucosa of pharynx; tonsil; stromal cell of endometrium; olfactory zone of nasal mucosa / n/a; More reference expression data
BioGPS	More reference expression data
Gene ontology
Molecular function	DNA-binding transcription factor activity; sequence-specific DNA binding; DNA binding; DNA-binding transcription factor activity, RNA polymerase II-specific
Cellular component	nucleus
Biological process	positive regulation of transcription, DNA-templated; soft palate development; hair follicle morphogenesis; thyroid hormone generation; thyroid gland development; negative regulation of transcription, DNA-templated; pharynx development; negative regulation of transcription by RNA polymerase II; cell migration; embryonic organ morphogenesis; regulation of transcription, DNA-templated; hard palate development; transcription, DNA-templated; thymus development; roof of mouth development; cranial skeletal system development; regulation of transcription by RNA polymerase II; anatomical structure morphogenesis; cell differentiation
Sources:Amigo / QuickGO
Orthologs
Databases	NCBI: entry; OMA: entry
Species	Human	Mouse
Entrez	2304	110805
Ensembl	ENSG00000178919	n/a
UniProt	O00358	Q8R2I0
RefSeq (mRNA)	NM_004473	NM_183298
RefSeq (protein)	NP_004464	NP_899121
Location (UCSC)	Chr 9: 97.85 – 97.86 Mb	n/a
PubMed search
- Wikidata
View/Edit Human	View/Edit Mouse

Forkhead box protein E1 is a protein that in humans is encoded by the FOXE1 gene.

== Location ==
The FOXE1 gene is located on the long (q) arm of chromosome 9 at position 22

== Function ==
This intronless gene belongs to the forkhead family of transcription factors, which is characterized by a distinct forkhead domain. This gene functions as a thyroid transcription factor which likely plays a crucial role in thyroid morphogenesis.

== Clinical significance ==
Mutations in this gene cause Bamforth-Lazarus syndrome and are associated with congenital hypothyroidism and cleft palate with thyroid dysgenesis. The map localization of this gene suggests it may also be a candidate gene for squamous cell epithelioma and hereditary sensory neuropathy type I.

The region surrounding the FOXE1 gene has shown association in the pathogenesis of cleft lip and palate with genome-wide levels of significance in linkage analysis studies with additional fine-mapping and replication.

== Tissue localization ==
FOXE1 is expressed transiently in the developing thyroid and the anterior pituitary gland.

Avian FOXE1 is also expressed in developing feathers.

== See also ==
- FOX proteins
