= DRAP1 =

Protein-coding gene in the species Homo sapiens

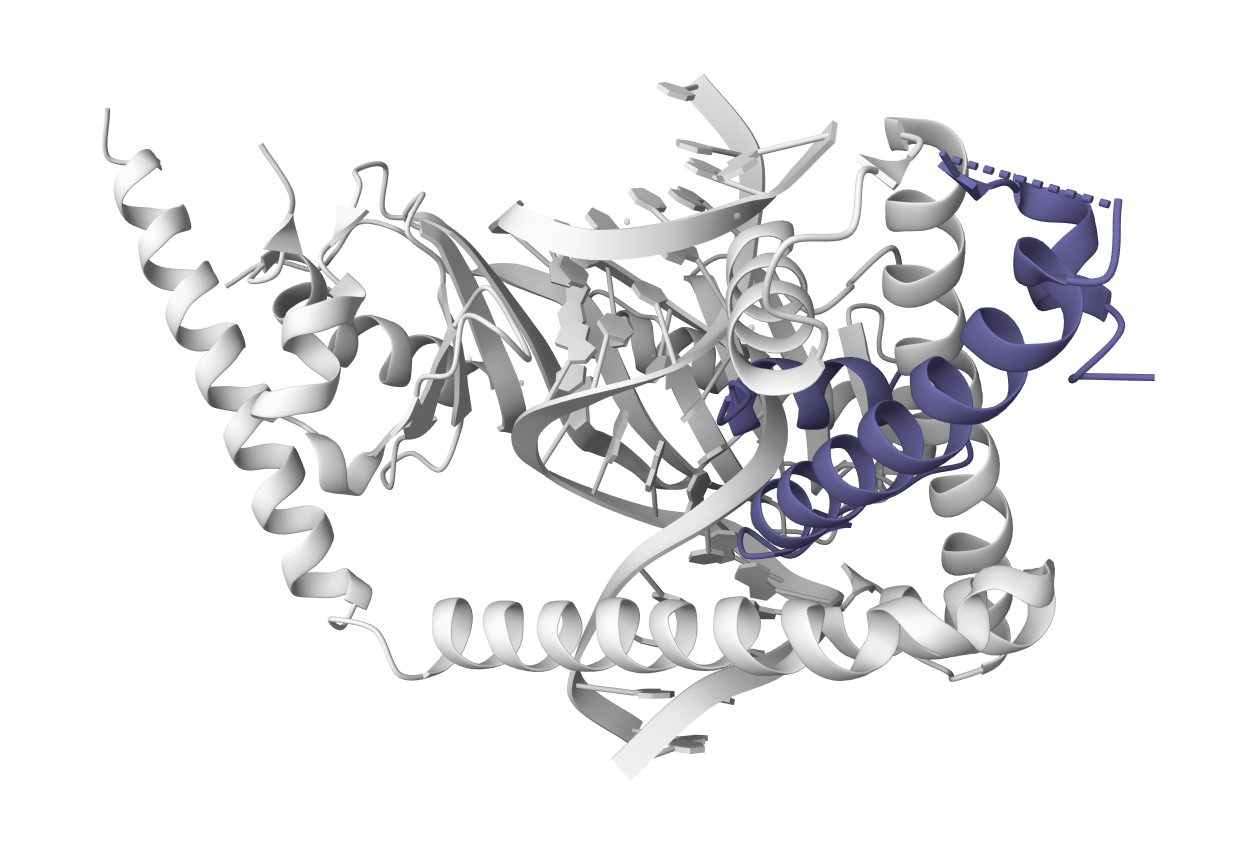

Identifiers
- Aliases: DRAP1, NC2-alpha, DR1 associated protein 1
- External IDs: OMIM: 602289; MGI: 1913806; GeneCards: DRAP1
Available structures
PDB	Ortholog search: PDBe RCSB
PDB	List of PDB id codes 1JFI

Gene location (Human)
Chr.	Chromosome 11 (human)
Band	11q13.1	Start	65,919,274 bp
Band	11q13.1	End	65,921,563 bp

Gene location (Mouse)
Chr.	Chromosome 19 (mouse)
Band	19|19 A	Start	5,472,833 bp
Band	19|19 A	End	5,475,007 bp
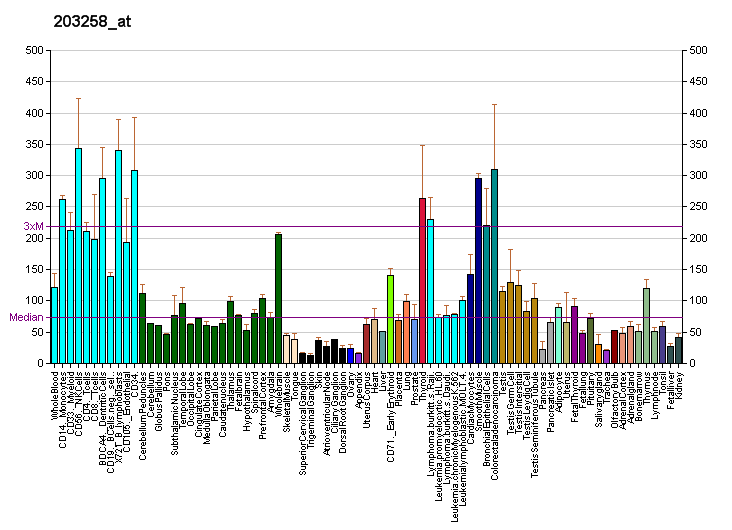
RNA expression pattern
Bgee	Human / Mouse (ortholog); Top expressed in: left testis; right testis; granulocyte; right hemisphere of cerebellum; right frontal lobe; left lobe of thyroid gland; right lobe of thyroid gland; apex of heart; prefrontal cortex; C1 segment / Top expressed in: muscle of thigh; triceps brachii muscle; dentate gyrus of hippocampal formation granule cell; medial head of gastrocnemius muscle; yolk sac; sternocleidomastoid muscle; neural layer of retina; superior frontal gyrus; temporal muscle; ventricular zone; More reference expression data
BioGPS	More reference expression data
Gene ontology
Molecular function	protein heterodimerization activity; protein binding; DNA-binding transcription factor activity; transcription corepressor activity; DNA binding; identical protein binding; DNA-binding transcription factor activity, RNA polymerase II-specific; chromatin binding; transcription coactivator activity; transcription factor binding; transcription coregulator activity
Cellular component	nucleus
Biological process	transcription, DNA-templated; negative regulation of transcription by RNA polymerase II; regulation of transcription, DNA-templated; positive regulation of transcription by RNA polymerase II; RNA polymerase II preinitiation complex assembly
Sources:Amigo / QuickGO
Orthologs
Databases	NCBI: entry; OMA: entry
Species	Human	Mouse
Entrez	10589	66556
Ensembl	ENSG00000175550	ENSMUSG00000024914
UniProt	Q14919	Q9D6N5
RefSeq (mRNA)	NM_006442	NM_001291080; NM_024176
RefSeq (protein)	NP_006433	NP_001278009; NP_077138
Location (UCSC)	Chr 11: 65.92 – 65.92 Mb	Chr 19: 5.47 – 5.48 Mb
PubMed search
- Wikidata
View/Edit Human	View/Edit Mouse

Dr1-associated corepressor is a protein that in humans is encoded by the DRAP1 gene.

Transcriptional repression is a general mechanism for regulating transcriptional initiation in organisms ranging from yeast to humans. Accurate initiation of transcription from eukaryotic protein-encoding genes requires the assembly of a large multiprotein complex consisting of RNA polymerase II and general transcription factors such as TFIIA, TFIIB, and TFIID. DR1 is a repressor that interacts with the TATA-binding protein (TBP) of TFIID and prevents the formation of an active transcription complex by precluding the entry of TFIIA and/or TFIIB into the preinitiation complex. The protein encoded by this gene is a corepressor of transcription that interacts with DR1 to enhance DR1-mediated repression. The interaction between this corepressor and DR1 is required for corepressor function and appears to stabilize the TBP-DR1-DNA complex.

== Interactions ==
DRAP1 has been shown to interact with FOXH1 and DR1.
