= FOXP4 =

Human protein-coding gene

Identifiers
- Aliases: FOXP4, hFKHLA, forkhead box P4
- External IDs: OMIM: 608924; MGI: 1921373; GeneCards: FOXP4

Gene location (Human)
Chr.	Chromosome 6 (human)
Band	6p21.1	Start	41,546,381 bp
Band	6p21.1	End	41,602,384 bp

Gene location (Mouse)
Chr.	Chromosome 17 (mouse)
Band	17|17 C	Start	48,178,058 bp
Band	17|17 C	End	48,235,570 bp
RNA expression pattern
Bgee	Human / Mouse (ortholog); Top expressed in: pylorus; body of stomach; cardia; cardiac muscle tissue of right atrium; ganglionic eminence; fundus; popliteal artery; tibial arteries; right coronary artery; myocardium of left ventricle / Top expressed in: sphenoid bone; genital tubercle; lesser wing of sphenoid bone; basisphenoid; ganglionic eminence; yolk sac; ventricular zone; urinary bladder; primary visual cortex; cerebellar cortex; More reference expression data
BioGPS	n/a
Gene ontology
Molecular function	DNA-binding transcription factor activity; sequence-specific DNA binding; DNA binding; protein binding; metal ion binding; DNA-binding transcription factor activity, RNA polymerase II-specific
Cellular component	nucleus
Biological process	regulation of transcription, DNA-templated; transcription, DNA-templated; regulation of transcription by RNA polymerase II; anatomical structure morphogenesis; cell differentiation
Sources:Amigo / QuickGO
Orthologs
Databases	NCBI: entry; OMA: entry
Species	Human	Mouse
Entrez	116113	74123
Ensembl	ENSG00000137166	ENSMUSG00000023991
UniProt	Q8IVH2	Q9DBY0
RefSeq (mRNA)	NM_001012426; NM_001012427; NM_138457; NM_001405824; NM_001405825 NM_001405826	NM_001110824; NM_001110825; NM_028767
RefSeq (protein)	NP_001012426; NP_001012427; NP_612466	NP_001104294; NP_001104295; NP_083043; NP_001390898; NP_001390899
Location (UCSC)	Chr 6: 41.55 – 41.6 Mb	Chr 17: 48.18 – 48.24 Mb
PubMed search
- Wikidata
View/Edit Human	View/Edit Mouse

Forkhead box protein P4 is a protein that in humans is encoded by the FOXP4 gene.

This gene belongs to subfamily P of the forkhead box (FOX) transcription factor family. Forkhead box transcription factors play important roles in the regulation of tissue- and cell type-specific gene transcription during both development and adulthood. Many members of the forkhead box gene family, including members of subfamily P, have roles in mammalian oncogenesis. This gene may play a role in the development of tumors of the kidney and larynx. Alternative splicing of this gene produces multiple transcript variants, some encoding different isoforms. It also is a major factor in developing Long COVID as such, increasing the chances of developing the little-understood syndrome 1.6 fold, a finding which has major implications for COVID-19 pandemic research.
