= FOXJ2 =

Protein-coding gene in humans

Identifiers
- Aliases: FOXJ2, FHX, forkhead box J2
- External IDs: MGI: 1926805; GeneCards: FOXJ2

Gene location (Human)
Chr.	Chromosome 12 (human)
Band	12p13.31	Start	8,032,716 bp
Band	12p13.31	End	8,055,517 bp

Gene location (Mouse)
Chr.	Chromosome 6 (mouse)
Band	6|6 F2	Start	122,796,873 bp
Band	6|6 F2	End	122,822,325 bp
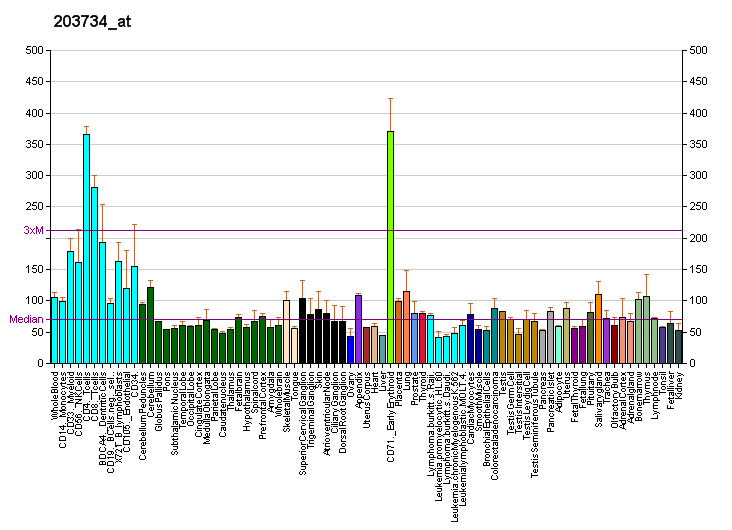
RNA expression pattern
Bgee	Human / Mouse (ortholog); Top expressed in: nipple; saphenous vein; cardia; vena cava; body of tongue; thoracic diaphragm; superior surface of tongue; Skeletal muscle tissue of rectus abdominis; pylorus; pericardium / Top expressed in: ankle; inner renal medulla; thin ascending limb of loop of Henle; triceps brachii muscle; extraocular muscle; vastus lateralis muscle; granulocyte; temporal muscle; ciliary body; ascending aorta; More reference expression data
BioGPS	More reference expression data
Gene ontology
Molecular function	DNA-binding transcription factor activity; RNA polymerase II cis-regulatory region sequence-specific DNA binding; sequence-specific DNA binding; DNA binding; DNA-binding transcription activator activity, RNA polymerase II-specific; protein binding; identical protein binding; DNA-binding transcription factor activity, RNA polymerase II-specific
Cellular component	nucleus; fibrillar center
Biological process	positive regulation of transcription, DNA-templated; regulation of transcription, DNA-templated; transcription, DNA-templated; positive regulation of transcription by RNA polymerase II; transcription by RNA polymerase II; anatomical structure morphogenesis; cell differentiation; negative regulation of angiogenesis; negative regulation of blood vessel endothelial cell differentiation; positive regulation of vascular associated smooth muscle cell proliferation
Sources:Amigo / QuickGO
Orthologs
Databases	NCBI: entry; OMA: entry
Species	Human	Mouse
Entrez	55810	60611
Ensembl	ENSG00000065970	ENSMUSG00000003154
UniProt	Q9P0K8	Q9ES18
RefSeq (mRNA)	NM_018416	NM_021899
RefSeq (protein)	NP_060886	NP_068699
Location (UCSC)	Chr 12: 8.03 – 8.06 Mb	Chr 6: 122.8 – 122.82 Mb
PubMed search
- Wikidata
View/Edit Human	View/Edit Mouse

Forkhead box protein J2 is a protein that in humans is encoded by the FOXJ2 gene.
