= Forkhead box D1 =

Human protein-coding gene

FOXD1

Identifiers
- Aliases: FOXD1, FKHL8, FREAC-4, FREAC4, forkhead box D1
- External IDs: OMIM: 601091; MGI: 1347463; GeneCards: FOXD1

Gene location (Human)
| Chr. | Chromosome 5 (human) |
| Band | 5q13.2 | Start | 73,444,827 bp |
| Band | 5q13.2 | End | 73,448,777 bp |
RNA expression pattern
| Bgee | Human / Mouse (ortholog); Top expressed in: tibia; sural nerve; trigeminal ganglion; cartilage tissue; spinal ganglia; retinal pigment epithelium; gonad; stromal cell of endometrium; testicle; metanephros / n/a; More reference expression data |
| BioGPS | n/a |
Gene ontology
| Molecular function | DNA binding; sequence-specific DNA binding; DNA-binding transcription factor activity; DNA binding, bending; RNA polymerase II cis-regulatory region sequence-specific DNA binding; DNA-binding transcription activator activity, RNA polymerase II-specific; DNA-binding transcription factor activity, RNA polymerase II-specific |
| Cellular component | nucleus |
| Biological process | regulation of transcription, DNA-templated; transcription, DNA-templated; branching involved in ureteric bud morphogenesis; kidney development; transcription by RNA polymerase II; axon guidance; positive regulation of gene expression; positive regulation of BMP signaling pathway; luteinizing hormone secretion; negative regulation of transcription, DNA-templated; positive regulation of transcription by RNA polymerase II; dichotomous subdivision of terminal units involved in ureteric bud branching; nephrogenic mesenchyme development; metanephric nephron development; metanephric capsule development; metanephric capsule specification; pattern specification involved in metanephros development; positive regulation of kidney development; anatomical structure morphogenesis; cell differentiation; regulation of transcription by RNA polymerase II |
Sources:Amigo / QuickGO
Orthologs
| Databases | NCBI: entry; OMA: entry |
| Species | Human | Mouse |
| Entrez | 2297 | 15229 |
| Ensembl | ENSG00000251493 | n/a |
| UniProt | Q16676 | Q61345 |
| RefSeq (mRNA) | NM_004472 | NM_008242 |
| RefSeq (protein) | NP_004463 | NP_032268 |
| Location (UCSC) | Chr 5: 73.44 – 73.45 Mb | n/a |
| PubMed search |
- Wikidata
| View/Edit Human | View/Edit Mouse |

Forkhead box D1 is a protein that in humans is encoded by the FOXD1 gene. Forkhead d1 is a kidney expressed transcription factor maps at the chromosome 5 at position 5q12—q13, identified in Drosophila forkhead protein and mammalian HNF3 transcription factor. The name of the protein was derived from two spiked head structures in the embryos of Drosophila forkhead mutant. It belongs to the transcription factor family, that displays remarkable functional diversity and is involved in a wide variety of biological processes. The most commonly used synonyms for Forkhead D1 are, FOX D1, FREAC-4 and BF2.

== Structure ==
The Forkhead domain in FOXD1 is distinctive from other members of the same family except, FREAC-9 also known as FOXD2. The amino acid sequence of the DNA binding forkhead motif of FREAC-4 is similar to FREAC-9, except 12 substitution are present at the nucleotide level. The DNA binding domain is winged helix consist of around 100 amino acids, has four helices and two stranded beta-sheets, the sequence extends from nucleotide 2521 to 4792. This gene is estimated to be approximately 2.5 kilo base pairs and, most likely introns less. The motif at NH_{2}-terminal part is highly acidic and rich in prolines at COOH terminal, this is similar to the transcription factor UBF and WT-1. It is indicated in cotransfection experiments, that the tumour suppressor gene p53 and WT-1 are potential regulators of FREAC-4. FOXD1 is expressed by two kidney derived cell line COS 7 and 293 cells. It also has high degree of sequence similarity with FOXD1 found by cloned mouse cDNA.

== Functions ==
Studies of the orthologous mouse protein indicate that it functions in kidney development by promoting nephron progenitor differentiation, and it also functions in the development of the retina and optic chiasm. It may also regulate inflammatory reactions and prevent autoimmunity.

FOXD1 and stromal cell have essential function during kidney Morphogenesis. Placental growth factor (PIGF) is a direct and physiologically relevant transcriptional target of FOXD1 and hence, it is co-expressed with FOXD1 for the development of renal stroma. Two isoforms of PIGF, PIGF1 and PIGF 2 are found in human. In an experiment, three genes were found to be identified by induced FOXD1 in Northern blotting. First, PIGF initiates stromal signal that regulate epithelial differentiation which functions as a growth factor in reactive angiogenesis during wound healing and tumorigenesis. Second, heparin binding epidermal growth factor and lastly, the bHLH protein G0S8.

Foxd1 is also required for proper formation of optic chiasm. During the formation of optic chiasm, Foxd1 is expressed in VT retina, as well as in the ventral diencephalon for retinal development and chiasm morphogenesis. During visual system development, retinal ganglion cell (RGC) axons leave the retina via optic disc until they reach the optic chiasm. Foxg1 and Foxd1 are expressed in adjacent domains in the neural tube at the time, the optical vesicle evaginates. Misexpression of Foxd1 and Foxg1 in chick retina creates projection error in retinal axons along the antiposterior axis in the tectum and, it also plays a role in the specification of contralateral RGCs. It is determined that Foxd1 is essential for the correct formation of optic chiasm.

FOX D1 expressed and function in Glioma cell behaviour, it upregulates and directly correlates with the glioma grade. Delayed expression of FOX D1 causes decreased glioma cell growth and reduce cell migration. There is a high probability that FOXD1 can serve as a novel regulator of glioblastoma cell behaviour that could be used as a novel target for gene targeted therapies. In mice, Foxd1 is expressed in the mesenchyme surrounding the pituitary gland, which is an essential source for signaling factors that regulate pituitary organogenesis. It suggests that Foxd1 is indirectly involved in Lhb expression and cartilage formation.

== Disease ==
The chromosomal duplication in the region 5q12-13 of chromosome 5 causes dysplastic kidneys and mental disorders which is relevant to tissue distribution o FREAC-4 mRNA.
