= LINC03025 =

Non-coding RNA in humans

Identifiers
- Aliases: LINC03025, uncharacterized LOC440896, long intergenic non-protein coding RNA 3025
- External IDs: GeneCards: LINC03025

Gene location (Human)
Chr.	Chromosome 9 (human)
Band	9p11.2	Start	41,100,793 bp
Band	9p11.2	End	41,119,909 bp
RNA expression pattern
Bgee	Human / Mouse (ortholog); Top expressed in: right uterine tube; left testis; right testis; hippocampus proper; testicle; superior frontal gyrus; right frontal lobe; Brodmann area 9; bone marrow cell; anterior cingulate cortex / n/a; More reference expression data
BioGPS	n/a
Orthologs
Databases	NCBI: entry; OMA: entry
Species	Human	Mouse
Entrez	440896	n/a
Ensembl	ENSG00000276462	n/a
UniProt	n a	n/a
RefSeq (mRNA)	n/a	n/a
RefSeq (protein)	n/a	n/a
Location (UCSC)	Chr 9: 41.1 – 41.12 Mb	n/a
PubMed search		n/a
- Wikidata
View/Edit Human

Long independently transcribed non-coding RNA 3025 is a non-coding RNA that in humans is encoded by the LINC03025 gene.
