= FOXS1 =

Protein-coding gene in the species Homo sapiens

Identifiers
- Aliases: FOXS1, FKHL18, FREAC10, forkhead box S1
- External IDs: OMIM: 602939; MGI: 95546; GeneCards: FOXS1

Gene location (Human)
Chr.	Chromosome 20 (human)
Band	20q11.21	Start	31,844,303 bp
Band	20q11.21	End	31,845,604 bp

Gene location (Mouse)
Chr.	Chromosome 2 (mouse)
Band	2|2 H1	Start	152,773,818 bp
Band	2|2 H1	End	152,775,128 bp
RNA expression pattern
Bgee	Human / Mouse (ortholog); Top expressed in: right coronary artery; left coronary artery; ascending aorta; testicle; Descending thoracic aorta; popliteal artery; tibial arteries; apex of heart; tibial nerve; right auricle of heart / Top expressed in: external carotid artery; internal carotid artery; embryo; sciatic nerve; muscle of thigh; Gonadal ridge; right kidney; stroma of bone marrow; spermatocyte; endothelial cell of lymphatic vessel; More reference expression data
BioGPS	n/a
Gene ontology
Molecular function	DNA-binding transcription factor activity; DNA binding; sequence-specific DNA binding; RNA polymerase II cis-regulatory region sequence-specific DNA binding; DNA-binding transcription repressor activity, RNA polymerase II-specific; DNA-binding transcription factor activity, RNA polymerase II-specific
Cellular component	nucleus
Biological process	blood vessel development; negative regulation of transcription, DNA-templated; regulation of transcription, DNA-templated; negative regulation of DNA-binding transcription factor activity; neuromuscular process controlling balance; transcription, DNA-templated; positive regulation of multicellular organism growth; negative regulation of transcription by RNA polymerase II; anatomical structure morphogenesis; cell differentiation; regulation of transcription by RNA polymerase II
Sources:Amigo / QuickGO
Orthologs
Databases	NCBI: entry; OMA: entry
Species	Human	Mouse
Entrez	2307	14239
Ensembl	ENSG00000179772	ENSMUSG00000074676
UniProt	O43638	Q61574
RefSeq (mRNA)	NM_004118	NM_010226
RefSeq (protein)	NP_004109	NP_034356
Location (UCSC)	Chr 20: 31.84 – 31.85 Mb	Chr 2: 152.77 – 152.78 Mb
PubMed search
- Wikidata
View/Edit Human	View/Edit Mouse

Forkhead box S1 is a protein that in humans is encoded by the FOXS1 gene.

== Function ==
The forkhead family of transcription factors belongs to the winged helix class of DNA-binding proteins. The protein encoded by this intronless gene contains a forkhead domain and is found predominantly in aorta and kidney. The function of the encoded protein is unknown. [provided by RefSeq, Jul 2008].
