= FOXQ1 =

Protein-coding gene in the species Homo sapiens

Identifiers
- Aliases: FOXQ1, HFH1, forkhead box Q1
- External IDs: OMIM: 612788; MGI: 1298228; GeneCards: FOXQ1

Gene location (Human)
| Chr. | Chromosome 6 (human) |
| Band | 6p25.3 | Start | 1,312,098 bp |
| Band | 6p25.3 | End | 1,314,758 bp |

Gene location (Mouse)
| Chr. | Chromosome 13 (mouse) |
| Band | 13 A3.2|13 13.46 cM | Start | 31,740,117 bp |
| Band | 13 A3.2|13 13.46 cM | End | 31,744,959 bp |
RNA expression pattern
| Bgee | Human / Mouse (ortholog); Top expressed in: parotid gland; pylorus; pancreatic epithelial cell; pancreatic ductal cell; endothelial cell; skin of arm; palpebral conjunctiva; skin of hip; secondary oocyte; skin of thigh / Top expressed in: transitional epithelium of urinary bladder; conjunctival fornix; pyloric antrum; epithelium of stomach; hair follicle; mucous cell of stomach; medullary collecting duct; submandibular gland; cornea; duodenum; More reference expression data |
| BioGPS | n/a |
Gene ontology
| Molecular function | DNA-binding transcription factor activity; sequence-specific DNA binding; DNA binding; RNA polymerase II cis-regulatory region sequence-specific DNA binding; DNA-binding transcription repressor activity, RNA polymerase II-specific; DNA-binding transcription factor activity, RNA polymerase II-specific |
| Cellular component | nucleus |
| Biological process | hair follicle morphogenesis; regulation of transcription, DNA-templated; transcription, DNA-templated; negative regulation of transcription by RNA polymerase II; anatomical structure morphogenesis; cell differentiation; regulation of transcription by RNA polymerase II; negative regulation of neuron apoptotic process |
Sources:Amigo / QuickGO
Orthologs
| Databases | NCBI: entry; OMA: entry |
| Species | Human | Mouse |
| Entrez | 94234 | 15220 |
| Ensembl | ENSG00000164379 | ENSMUSG00000038415 |
| UniProt | Q9C009 | O70220 |
| RefSeq (mRNA) | NM_033260 | NM_008239 |
| RefSeq (protein) | NP_150285 | NP_032265 |
| Location (UCSC) | Chr 6: 1.31 – 1.31 Mb | Chr 13: 31.74 – 31.74 Mb |
| PubMed search |
- Wikidata
| View/Edit Human | View/Edit Mouse |

Forkhead box Q1 is a protein that in humans is encoded by the FOXQ1 gene.

== Function ==
FOXQ1 is a member of the FOX gene family, which is characterized by a conserved 110-amino acid DNA-binding motif called the forkhead or winged helix domain. FOX genes are involved in embryonic development, cell cycle regulation, tissue-specific gene expression, cell signaling, and tumorigenesis (Bieller et al., 2001 [PubMed 11747606]).
