= FOXD4 =

Protein-coding gene in the species Homo sapiens

Identifiers
- Aliases: FOXD4, FKHL9, FOXD4A, FREAC-5, FREAC5, forkhead box D4
- External IDs: OMIM: 601092; MGI: 1347467; GeneCards: FOXD4

Gene location (Human)
Chr.	Chromosome 9 (human)
Band	9p24.3	Start	116,231 bp
Band	9p24.3	End	118,417 bp

Gene location (Mouse)
Chr.	Chromosome 19 (mouse)
Band	19 B|19 19.86 cM	Start	24,876,600 bp
Band	19 B|19 19.86 cM	End	24,878,561 bp
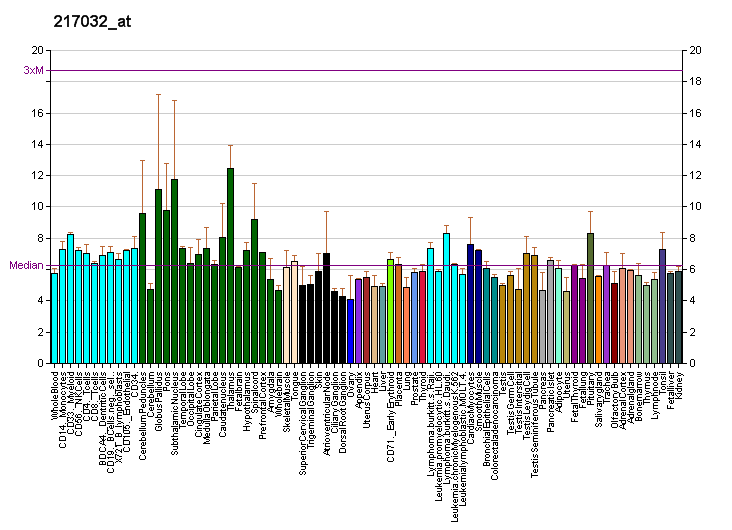
RNA expression pattern
Bgee	Human / Mouse (ortholog); Top expressed in: cerebellum; cerebellar cortex; cerebellar hemisphere; right hemisphere of cerebellum; granulocyte; prefrontal cortex; putamen; stromal cell of endometrium; anterior cingulate cortex; caudate nucleus / Top expressed in: granulocyte; embryo; hypoblast; embryonic organizer; red nucleus; endoderm; notochord; spermatocyte; mesoderm; spinal ganglia; More reference expression data
BioGPS	More reference expression data
Gene ontology
Molecular function	DNA-binding transcription factor activity; sequence-specific DNA binding; DNA binding; DNA binding, bending; DNA-binding transcription factor activity, RNA polymerase II-specific
Cellular component	nucleus
Biological process	regulation of transcription, DNA-templated; transcription, DNA-templated; regulation of transcription by RNA polymerase II; anatomical structure morphogenesis; cell differentiation
Sources:Amigo / QuickGO
Orthologs
Databases	NCBI: entry; OMA: entry
Species	Human	Mouse
Entrez	2298	14237
Ensembl	ENSG00000170122	ENSMUSG00000051490
UniProt	Q12950	Q60688
RefSeq (mRNA)	NM_207305	NM_008022
RefSeq (protein)	NP_997188	NP_032048
Location (UCSC)	Chr 9: 0.12 – 0.12 Mb	Chr 19: 24.88 – 24.88 Mb
PubMed search
- Wikidata
View/Edit Human	View/Edit Mouse

Forkhead box protein D4 is a protein that in humans is encoded by the FOXD4 gene.
