= Hepatocyte nuclear factors =

Transcription factors

Hepatocyte nuclear factors (HNFs) are a group of phylogenetically unrelated transcription factors that regulate the transcription of a diverse group of genes into proteins. These proteins include blood clotting factors and in addition, enzymes and transporters involved with glucose, cholesterol, and fatty acid transport and metabolism.

== Function ==
As the name suggests, hepatocyte nuclear factors are expressed predominantly in the liver. However HNFs are also expressed and play important roles in a number of other tissues so that the name hepatocyte nuclear factor is somewhat misleading. Nevertheless, the liver is the only tissue in which a significant number of different HNFs are expressed at the same time. In addition, there are a number of genes which contain multiple promoter and enhancer regions each regulated by a different HNF. Furthermore, efficient expression of these genes require synergistic activation by multiple HNFs. Hence hepatocyte nuclear factors function to ensure liver specific expression of certain genes.

As is the case with many transcription factors, HNFs regulate the expression of a wide variety of target genes and therefore functions. These functions (and especially functions involving the liver) include development and metabolic homeostasis of the organism. For example, HNFs influence expression of the insulin gene as well as genes involved in glucose transport and metabolism. In embryo development, HNF4α is thought to have an important role in the development of the liver, kidney, and intestines.

== Disease implication ==
Variants of the genes can cause several relatively rare forms of MODY, an inherited, early onset form of diabetes. Mutations in the HNF4α, HNF1α, or HNF1β genes are linked to MODY 1, MODY 3, and MODY 5 respectively. Mutations in HNF genes are also associated with a number of others diseases including hepatic adenomas and renal cysts.

== Members ==
The following is a list of human hepatocyte nuclear factors (see also boxes to the right for additional information about these proteins):

=== HNF1 ===
Members of the HNF1 subfamily contain a POU-homeodomain and bind to DNA as homodimers.

- HNF1α/TCF1/MODY3 (related disease: MODY 3)
- HNF1β/TCF2/MODY5 (related disease: MODY 5)

hepatocyte nuclear factor 1, alpha
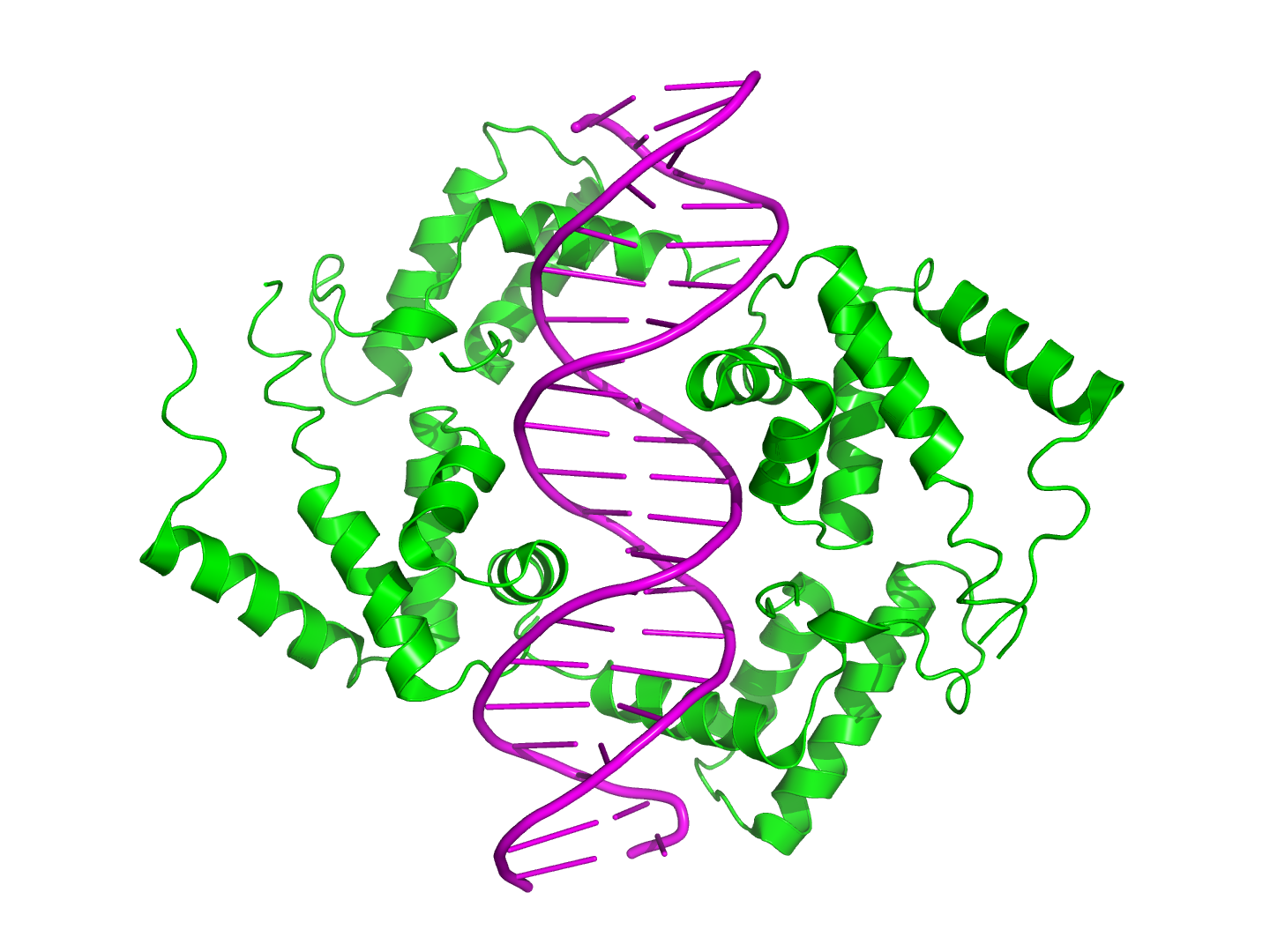
- Structure of the hepatocyte nuclear factor 1A (green cartoon) bound to DNA (magenta) based on the crystallographic coordinates PDB: 1IC8.

Identifiers
- Symbol: HNF1A
- Alt. symbols: MODY3, HNF1, LFB1, TCF1
- NCBI gene: 6927
- HGNC: 11621
- OMIM: 142410
- PDB: 1JB6
- RefSeq: NM_000545
- UniProt: P20823

Other data
- Locus: Chr. 12 q24.3-12q24.3
Search for
- Structures: Swiss-model
- Domains: InterPro

hepatocyte nuclear factor 1, beta

Identifiers
- Symbol: HNF1B
- Alt. symbols: TCF2, HNF1beta, LFB3 MODY5, VHNF1
- NCBI gene: 6928
- HGNC: 11630
- OMIM: 189907
- PDB: 2H8R
- RefSeq: NM_000458
- UniProt: P35680

Other data
- Locus: Chr. 17 q12-17q12
Search for
- Structures: Swiss-model
- Domains: InterPro

=== HNF3 ===
The HNF3 subfamily members contain a winged helix DNA-binding domain and bind to DNA as monomers.

- HNF3α/FOXA1 (forkhead box A1)
- HNF3β/FOXA2 (forkhead box A2)
- HNF3γ/FOXA3 (forkhead box A3)

hepatocyte nuclear factor 3, alpha

Identifiers
- Symbol: FOXA1
- Alt. symbols: HNF3A
- NCBI gene: 3169
- HGNC: 5021
- OMIM: 602294
- RefSeq: NM_004496
- UniProt: P55317

Other data
- Locus: Chr. 14 q12-q13
Search for
- Structures: Swiss-model
- Domains: InterPro

hepatocyte nuclear factor 3, beta

Identifiers
- Symbol: FOXA2
- Alt. symbols: HNF3B
- NCBI gene: 3170
- HGNC: 5022
- OMIM: 600288
- RefSeq: NM_021784
- UniProt: Q9Y261

Other data
- Locus: Chr. 20 p1120p11
Search for
- Structures: Swiss-model
- Domains: InterPro

hepatocyte nuclear factor 3, gamma

Identifiers
- Symbol: FOXA3
- Alt. symbols: HNF3G
- NCBI gene: 3171
- HGNC: 5023
- OMIM: 602295
- RefSeq: NM_004497
- UniProt: P55318

Other data
- Locus: Chr. 19 q13.2-q13.4
Search for
- Structures: Swiss-model
- Domains: InterPro

=== HNF4 ===
Members of the HNF4 subfamily are nuclear receptors and bind to DNA either as homodimers or RXR heterodimers.

- HNF4α/TCF14/MODY1
- HNF4γ

hepatocyte nuclear factor 4 alpha

Identifiers
- Symbol: HNF4A
- Alt. symbols: MODY, MODY1, NR2A1, TCF14
- NCBI gene: 3172
- HGNC: 5024
- OMIM: 600281
- PDB: 1M7W
- RefSeq: NM_001030004
- UniProt: P41235

Other data
- Locus: Chr. 20 q12-20q13.1
Search for
- Structures: Swiss-model
- Domains: InterPro

hepatocyte nuclear factor 4 gamma

Identifiers
- Symbol: HNF4G
- Alt. symbols: NR2A2
- NCBI gene: 3174
- HGNC: 5026
- OMIM: 605966
- PDB: 1LV2
- RefSeq: NM_004133
- UniProt: Q14541

Other data
- Locus: Chr. 8 q21-q22
Search for
- Structures: Swiss-model
- Domains: InterPro

=== HNF6 ===
The HNF6 subfamily members contain a cut-homeodomain (ONECUT) bind to DNA as monomers.

- HNF6α/OC-1/ONECUT1 (ONECUT1)
- HNF6β/OC-2/ONECUT2 (ONECUT2)

hepatocyte nuclear factor 6, alpha

Identifiers
- Symbol: ONECUT1
- Alt. symbols: HNF6, HNF6A
- NCBI gene: 3175
- HGNC: 8138
- OMIM: 604164
- RefSeq: NM_004498
- UniProt: Q9UBC0

Other data
- Locus: Chr. 15 q21-q21.2
Search for
- Structures: Swiss-model
- Domains: InterPro

hepatocyte nuclear factor 6, beta

Identifiers
- Symbol: ONECUT2
- Alt. symbols: HNF6B, OC-2
- NCBI gene: 9480
- HGNC: 8139
- OMIM: 604894
- RefSeq: NM_004852
- UniProt: O95948

Other data
- Locus: Chr. 18 q21.1-21.2
Search for
- Structures: Swiss-model
- Domains: InterPro

== See also ==
- HNF4
- Transcription (genetics)
- Maturity onset diabetes of the young

== Additional images ==
Hepatocyte nuclear factor 1A bound to DNA

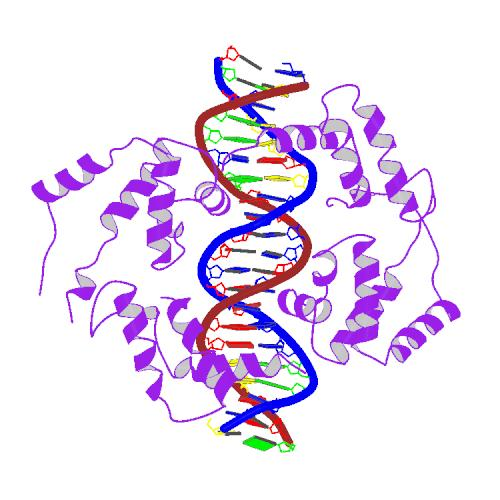
Different rendering of HNF1a bound to DNA
