= FOXA =

FOXA may refer to:

== Companies ==
- 21st Century Fox, a conglomerate traded on Nasdaq as FOXA from 2013 to 2019
- Fox Corporation, the successor to 21st Century Fox with the same ticker symbol

== Science ==
- FOXA1, a protein
- FOXA2, a transcription factor
- FOXA3, a protein
