= 17q12 microdeletion syndrome =

Rare genetic anomaly in humans

- Other names: 17q12 deletion syndrome
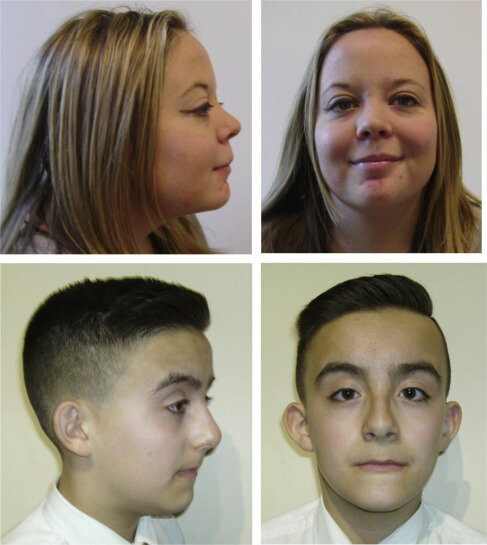
- This Illustration shows 2 patients with 17q12 microdeletion syndrome. They have typical facial features of this disorder such as high arched eyebrows, high forehead, long philtrum, anteverted nares, and long face.
- Specialty: Medical genetics
- Symptoms: Kidney problems, diabetes, reproductive anomalies, neuroatypicality
- Usual onset: Conception
- Duration: Lifelong
- Causes: Chromosome microdeletion
- Diagnostic method: Fluorescence in situ hybridization

17q12 microdeletion syndrome, also known as 17q12 deletion syndrome, is a rare chromosomal anomaly caused by the deletion of a small amount of material from a region in the long arm of chromosome 17. It is typified by deletion of the HNF1B gene, resulting in kidney abnormalities and renal cysts and diabetes syndrome. It also has neurocognitive effects, and has been implicated as a genetic factor for autism and schizophrenia.

17q12 microdeletion syndrome is not to be confused with 17q12 microduplication syndrome, caused by the addition of genetic material in the same region from which it is removed in the microdeletion, or with 17q21.31 microdeletion syndrome, another name for Koolen–De Vries syndrome.

== Presentation ==
17q12 microdeletions have a variable phenotype, ranging from few or no symptoms to severe disability. The condition is thought to be underdiagnosed, and cases with milder phenotypes may not reach clinical attention unless they have an affected child themselves. The most characteristic symptom is renal cysts and diabetes syndrome (RCAD), also known as "MODY 5", which is caused by deletion of the associated HNF1B gene in the region. RCAD is associated with kidney abnormalities and a characteristic form of diabetes that causes atrophy of the pancreas. However, some people with 17q12 microdeletions have normal renal function. RCAD is diagnosed in approximately 40% of people with 17q12 microdeletions, usually prior to age 25, while kidney abnormalities more broadly occur in approximately 85-90%.

People with 17q12 microdeletions have a characteristic facial phenotype, albeit a subtle one not usually obvious in daily life. Macrocephaly is common, along with high arched eyebrows, flattening of the malar region, and epicanthic folds. Pathological short stature is possible, and a characteristic "short and stocky" body shape occurs in many cases.

17q12 microdeletions are associated with neurocognitive and developmental involvement of variable severity. Some have mild to moderate intellectual disability; however, such impairment is not universal. Average intelligence is in the average to low average range. Speech delay is common, regardless of intellectual functioning. The most striking association between 17q12 microdeletions and neurodevelopment is the raised prevalence of autism spectrum disorder, with significant increases in both diagnosis and subclinical autistic traits. 17q12 microdeletions have been implicated as one of the major genetic causes of high-functioning autistic spectrum disorders. Schizophrenia is also a significant psychiatric complication of 17q12 microdeletion syndrome. 17q12 microdeletions are estimated to occur in approximately 1 in 1,600 people with schizophrenia, compared to an estimation of below 1 in 50,000 in the general population. Epilepsy, usually mild, occurs in approximately one-third of cases.

Reproductive system anomalies are associated with 17q12 microdeletions, particularly in females. 17q12 microdeletions have been linked to uterine malformations, most frequently Müllerian agenesis, where the uterus and part of the vaginal canal are absent.

Autosomal dominant inheritance

== Causes ==
17q12 microdeletion syndrome is an autosomal dominant disorder, where one copy of the relevant mutation is enough to cause the condition. Most cases are de novo, or spontaneous mutations that do not occur in the proband's parents; approximately 75% are de novo, while 25% are inherited. People with 17q12 microdeletions who have normal fertility have a 50% chance of passing the deletion down to their offspring. Environmental factors have not been implicated in the syndrome.

== Diagnosis ==
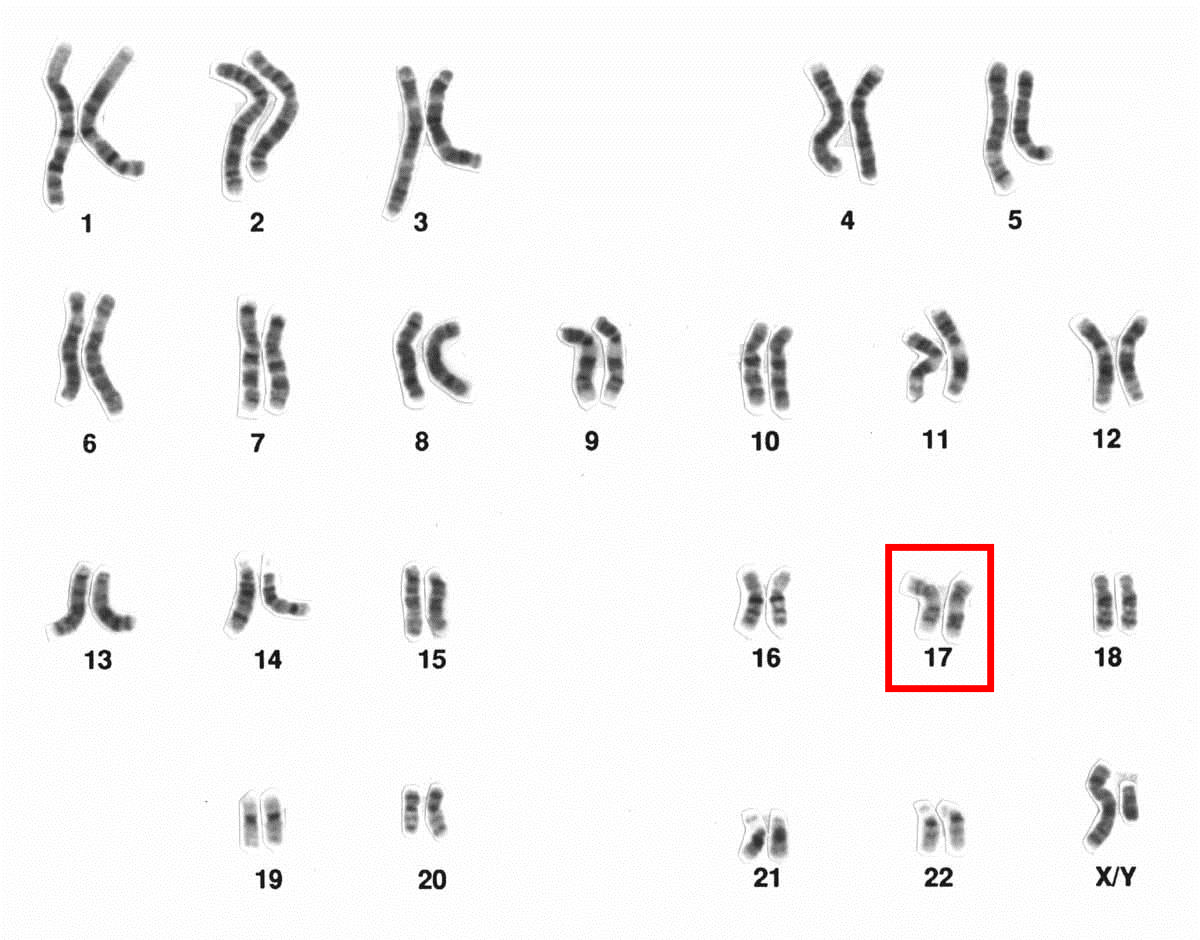
The human karyotype with chromosome 17 highlighted

Like other chromosomal microdeletions, 17q12 microdeletion syndrome is diagnosed via fluorescence in situ hybridization. Traditional karyotyping, used to diagnose major chromosomal disorders such as aneuploidy, is rarely sensitive enough to detect microdeletions.

== Treatment ==
As the underlying 17q12 microdeletion is an innate genetic disorder, it cannot by itself be treated. Rather, treatment is symptomatic and supportive. The high prevalence of kidney disease indicates routine monitoring of renal function, particularly in people taking potentially nephrotoxic medications such as lithium. The comorbidities involved in 17q12 microdeletion syndrome require caution in medical treatment; for instance, the increased risk of diabetes requires strict monitoring for post-transplantation diabetes mellitus in kidney transplant patients, as does the risk of weight gain and diabetes from neuroleptic drugs in those with a mental health diagnosis.

== Epidemiology ==
The prevalence of 17q12 microdeletion syndrome is unknown, and it is likely to be underdiagnosed. 17q12 microdeletions are estimated to occur in approximately 1 in 600 people on the autism spectrum and 1 in 1,600 with schizophrenia, but are far rarer in the general population. General prevalence is estimated to be between 1 in 14,000 and 1 in 62,500.

In addition to the increased prevalence in autism and schizophrenia, some other clinical populations have increased prevalence of 17q12 microdeletion syndrome. The condition occurs in approximately 2% of those with congenital kidney abnormalities and 3-6% of women with Müllerian agenesis. It is one of the ten most common microdeletions amongst children with idiopathic developmental delay.

== Microduplication ==
17q12 microduplication syndrome is far rarer than the corresponding microdeletion, estimated to occur roughly one-fifth as frequently as 17q12 microdeletion syndrome. Due to its rarity and the overlap between their phenotypes, 17q12 microduplications are usually discussed as an adjunct to microdeletions. Like the microdeletion syndrome, the microduplication syndrome has a broad phenotypic range, ranging from asymptomatic to profound disability; intellectual disability is frequently but not always more severe than the microdeletion, while physical health is often better. Epilepsy is a frequent finding. A case of sex reversal has been reported. While autism comorbid with 17q12 microduplication has been reported, it appears far rarer than in the microdeletion. Physical anomalies associated with 17q12 microduplication syndrome include syndactyly, microcephaly, epicanthic folds, and thick eyebrows or a unibrow. The 17q12 microduplication appears to have a low penetrance, as many cases are inherited from asymptomatic parents.

== See also ==
- Causes of autism
- Risk factors of schizophrenia
