= RCAD =

RCAD may refer to:

- Renal cysts and diabetes syndrome, a medical condition
- Ringling College of Art and Design, private art and design school in Sarasota, Florida
