= C14orf119 =

Protein-coding gene in the species Homo sapiens

Identifiers
- Aliases: C14orf119, chromosome 14 open reading frame 119
- External IDs: MGI: 1920893; GeneCards: C14orf119

Gene location (Human)
Chr.	Chromosome 14 (human)
Band	14q11.2	Start	23,095,505 bp
Band	14q11.2	End	23,100,456 bp

Gene location (Mouse)
Chr.	Chromosome 14 (mouse)
Band	14|14 C2	Start	54,923,673 bp
Band	14|14 C2	End	54,928,198 bp
RNA expression pattern
Bgee	Human / Mouse (ortholog); Top expressed in: mucosa of ileum; stromal cell of endometrium; mucosa of sigmoid colon; islet of Langerhans; smooth muscle tissue; rectum; decidua; oocyte; mucosa of transverse colon; right adrenal cortex / Top expressed in: olfactory epithelium; medullary collecting duct; primitive streak; otic placode; abdominal wall; medial ganglionic eminence; endocardial cushion; fossa; condyle; efferent ductule; More reference expression data
BioGPS	n/a
Orthologs
Databases	NCBI: entry; OMA: entry
Species	Human	Mouse
Entrez	55017	58248
Ensembl	ENSG00000179933	ENSMUSG00000040822
UniProt	Q9NWQ9	Q9JJ93
RefSeq (mRNA)	NM_017924	NM_021437
RefSeq (protein)	NP_060394	NP_067412
Location (UCSC)	Chr 14: 23.1 – 23.1 Mb	Chr 14: 54.92 – 54.93 Mb
PubMed search
- Wikidata
View/Edit Human	View/Edit Mouse

C14orf119 is a protein that in humans is encoded by the c14orf119 gene. The c14orf119 protein is predicted to be localized in the nucleus. Additionally, c14orf119 expression is decreased in individuals with systemic lupus erythematosus (SLE) when compared with healthy individual and is increased in individuals with various types of lymphomas when compared to healthy individuals.

== Gene ==
The common aliases of c14orf119 are chromosome open reading frame 119 and My028. The gene is located on chromosome 14, with the specific location of 14q11.2. It contains two exons and covers 5.76 kb, from 23563900 to 23569660 on the forward strand. The span of the c14orf119 gene, from the start of transcription to the polyA site, is 4951 basepairs in length.

== Transcripts ==
The c14orf119 mRNA is composed of 2914 basepairs. C14orf119 has two isoforms, shown in the table below.

C14orf119 Isoforms
Name	Accession number	Transcript ID	Length
C14orf119-201	NM_017924.4	ENST00000319074.6	2914 nt
C14orf119-202	XM_017021390.2	ENST00000554203.1	725 nt

== Protein ==
The c14orf119 protein is composed of 140 amino acids. The molecular weight of the c14orf119 protein is approximately 16 kDa and the basal isoelectric point is 4.86. There is a long section of hydrophobic amino acids at the start of the protein. There are no additional significant compositional features of the c14orf119 protein, including charge clusters, charge runs, patterns, repetitive structures or multiplets. The primary sequence of the c14orf119 protein is as follows,

MPLESSSSMP LSFPSLLPSV PHNTNPSPPL MSYITSQEMK CILHWFANWS GPQRERFLED LVAKAVPEKL

QPLLDSLEQL SVSGADRPPS IFECQLHLWD QWFRGWAEQE RNEFVRQLEF SEPDFVAKFY QAVAATAGKD

There are two known c14orf119 protein isoforms, as shown in the table below.

C14orf119 Protein Isoforms
Name	Accession number	Size	Domain Inclusion
Uncharacterized c14orf119 protein	NP_060394.1	140 aa	DUF4508
Uncharacterized c14orf119 protein isoform X1	XP_016876879.1	140 aa	DUF4508

=== Domains and motifs ===
There is a domain of unknown function (DUF) found in the c14orf119 protein: DUF4508 (with an E-value of 6.3e-36). This DUF is a part of a family of proteins that is found in eukaryotes and is typically between 117 and 253 amino acids in length. Additionally, there are three predicted CK2 phosphorylation sites (at positions 36, 83, and 121) within the c14orf119 protein.

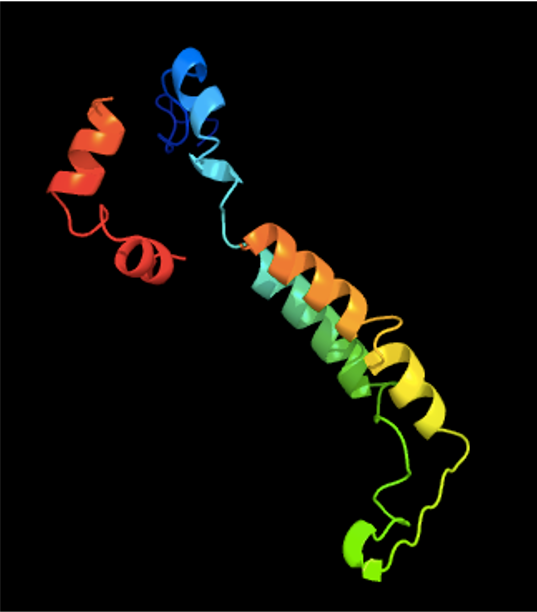
Figure 1. Phyre2 predicted secondary structure of the c14orf119 protein.

=== Secondary structure ===
The predicted secondary structure of the c14orf119 protein is largely alpha helical in content. The specific makeup of the secondary structure is as follows, alpha helices make up 38.57% of the protein (54 amino acids), extended strands make up 23.57% of the protein (33 amino acids), and random coils make up 37.86% of the protein (53 amino acids). Phryre2, a program for protein modeling, prediction, and analysis, was used to determine and model the predicted structure of the c14orf119 protein. Shown in Figure 1, Phyre2 created a model for the predicted structure of 106 (out of a total of 140) residues of the c14orf119 protein, with 79.7% confidence and 76% coverage.

=== Tertiary and quaternary structures ===
With only two cysteines, 52 amino acids apart, found in the c14orf119 protein sequence, there were no predicted disulfide bonds in the c14orf119 protein. There are no predicted transmembrane regions or signal peptides in the c14orf119 protein.

== Gene level regulation ==
=== Promoter ===
The predicted promoter sequence associated with c14orf119 is 3332 bases in length. This promoter sequence has one CpG island associated with it, with a CpG count of 78 Additionally, there are a number of transcription factor binding sites associated with this promoter sequence, such as RB1, HNF4A, ETS1, and RBL2.

=== Expression pattern ===
C14orf119 is expressed in 203 organs. The c14orf119 gene is expressed in a number of tissues and has the highest expression rates in cultured fibroblast cells, with a TPM of 75.63. There is notable decreased expression of c14orf119 in the following tissues, pancreas, bone marrow, brain, salivary glands, and the liver. Additionally, there is notable increased expression of c14orf119 in the adrenal gland, kidney, lung, prostate, thymus, white blood cells, lymph node, and thyroid. Finally, expression levels of c14orf119 decrease with the development of the kidney and increases with development of the stomach.

== Transcript level regulation ==
There were no predicted enhancers associated with c14orf119. There were a number of stem loop formation predictions in both the 5' UTR and 3' UTR of c14orf119.

=== miRNA targeting ===
The miRNA binding sites found in the 3' UTR of c14orf119 include miR-489, miR-1872, and miR-4778-3p; however, there were no miRNA binding sites found in the 5' UTR of c14orf119.

== Protein level regulation ==
=== Subcellular localization ===
The c14orf119 protein is predicted to be located in the nucleus, with a reliability score of 55.5. However, the protein has a 7.9% basic residue content and a nuclear localization signal (NLS) score of -0.47. Additionally, there was a predicted ER retention motif at positions 136-139 of the protein. Finally, there were no N-terminal signal peptides, no cleavage sites for mitochondria, no actinin-type actin-binding motifs, and no N-myristolyation pattern.

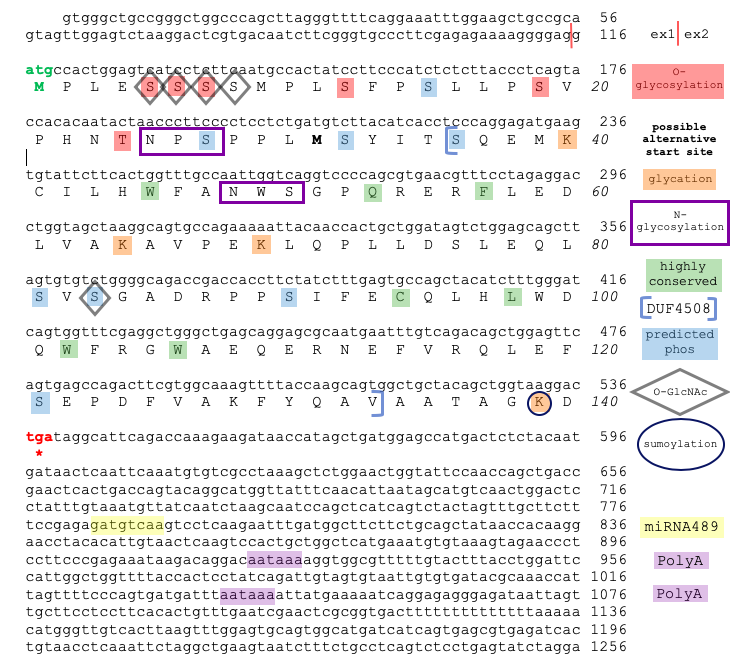
Figure 2. Conceptual translation of c14orf119, which reveals predicted post-translational modifications.

=== Post-translational modifications ===
There are a number of post-translational modifications of the c14orf119 protein, all of which are shown on the conceptual translation of c14orf119 in Figure 2.

There are predicted ubiquitination sites at lysine residues at positions 128 and 139.

There are predicted kinase-specific phosphorylation sites at serines at the following position in the c14orf119 protein sequence, 15, 19, 27, 32, 36, 81, 83, 90, and 121. Protein phosphorylation at serine residues can play critical roles in the regulation of protein function and the transmission of signals throughout the cell.

There are two N-glycosylation sites at positions 25-27 and 48–50. This type of post-translational modification plays important roles in both the structure and function of some eukaryotic proteins.

Additionally, there are predicted glycation of epsilon amino groups of lysines at the following positions, 40, 64, 69, and 139. Glycation is a process in which proteins react with reducing sugar molecules, which ultimately impairs the function and changes the characteristics of the protein.

There are also predicted mammalian mucin type GalNAc-O-glycosylation sites at the following positions, 5, 6, 7, 12, 15, 19, and 24. GalNAc-type-O-glycosylation is the attachment of a sugar molecule to the oxygen atom of serine or threonine residues in a protein. O-glycans or the sugars added to the serine or threonine, have various functions, including allowing recognition of foreign material, providing cartilage and tendon flexibility, controlling cell metabolism, and trafficking cells in the immune system.

There is a predicted SUMOylation sites at the lysine at position 139. SUMOylation is involved in transcriptional regulation, protein stability, apoptosis, nuclear-cytosolic transport, progression through the cell cycle, and response to stress.

Finally, there are predicted O-GlcNAc sites at the serines at the following position in the c14orf119 protein, 5, 6, 7, 8, and 83. This post-translational modification can play various critical roles such as, progression through the cell cycle, response to cellular stress, protein turnover, and protein stability.

== Regulation of expression ==
=== Epigenetic ===
There are varying levels of H3K27ac, H3K4me1, and H3K4me3 throughout the c14orf119 gene. H3K4me1 has variation in signal strength among different cell lines, which may reflect differences of epigenetic landscapes in these cell lines. Additionally, there is a strong signal of H3K27ac across the majority of cell lines along the predicted promoter region. Finally, there is also a strong signal of H3K4me3 across the majority of the cell types along the predicted promoter region, with no signal variation across cell types.

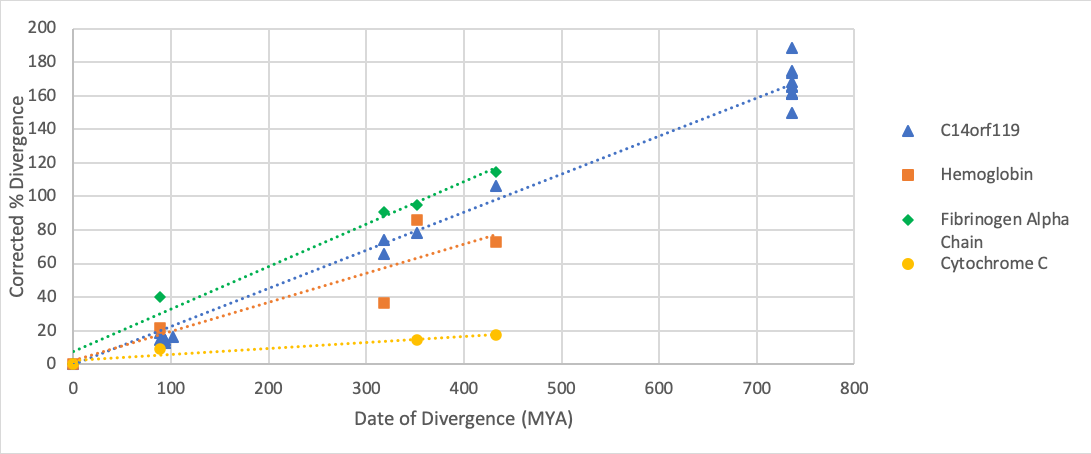
Figure 3. Date of divergence graph for c14orf119, with comparison to hemoglobin, fibrinogen alpha chain, and cytochrome c.

== Homology/evolution ==
C14orf119 is conserved in both vertebrates and invertebrates, however, it is not conserved in bacteria, archaea, trichoplax, plants or fungi. The c14orf119 gene is highly conserved in the mammalian orthologs, however, within the non-mammalian orthologs, there are various insertions, especially at the beginning and end of the gene. This gene does not contain any paralogs or paralogous domains.

As shown in Figure 3, the c14orf119 gene has evolved moderately quickly when compared to cytochrome c, fibrinogen alpha chain, and hemoglobin. It has evolved faster than both hemoglobin and cytochrome c, but slower than fibrinogen alpha chain.

The table below reveals the various orthologs of the c14orf119 protein. This table includes the date of divergence (DoD) from humans, in million years ago (MYA), accession number, and percent identity and similarity to humans for each ortholog.

C14orf119 Orthologs
Genus and species	Common name	Taxonomy - Class	Taxonomy - Order	DoD (MYA)	Accession number	Sequence length (aa)	Percent identity	Percent Similarity
Homo sapiens	Human	Mammalia	Primates	0	NP_060394.1	140	100	100
Mus musculus	Mouse	Mammalia	Rodentia	89	NP_067412.1	142	83.1	90.1
Myotis brandtii	Brandt's Bat	Mammalia	Chiroptera	94	XP_005852873.1	141	86.5	90.8
Callorhinus ursinus	Northern Fur Seal	Mammalia	Carnivora	94	XP_025726115.1	142	88	91.5
Bos taurus	Cattle	Mammalia	Artiodactyla	94	XP_002690553.1	142	88	92.3
Orycteropus afer afer	Aardvark	Mammalia	Tubulidentata	102	XP_007949377.1	140	85.1	89.4
Python bivittatus	Burmese Python	Reptilia	Squamata	318	XP_007441564.1	156	47.8	60.2
Podarcia muralis	Common Wall Lizard	Reptilia	Squamata	318	XP_028559108.1	115	51.8	63.8
Nanorana parkeri	High Himalaya Frog	Amphibia	Anura	351.7	XP_018411628.1	115	45.7	60.7
Larimichthys crocea	Marine Fish	Actinopterygii	Perciformes	433	XP_010740478.3	201	34.5	44.3
Aethina tumida	Small Hive Beetle	Insecta	Coleoptera	736	XP_019869014.1	124	18.6	39.7
Bombus terrestris	Buff-Tailed Bumblebee	Insecta	Hymenoptera	736	XP_020718687.1	125	19	36.1
Photinus pyraliis	Common Eastern Firefly	Insecta	Coleoptera	736	XP_031358233.1	128	19.9	40.4
Pieris rapae	Cabbage White Butterfly	Insecta	Lepidoptera	736	XP_022116245.1	180	20	38.4
Nasonia vitripennis	Small Parasitoid Wasp	Insecta	Hymenoptera	736	XP_031785555.1	121	22.4	42.1
Biomphalaria glabrata	Freshwater Snail	Gastropoda	Basommatophora	736	XP_013090201.1	113	31.7	46.2
Aplysia californica	California Seahorse	Gastropoda	Anaspidea	736	XP_005112416.1	112	32.6	47.9

== Function/biochemistry ==
The function of the c14orf119 protein is not yet well understood by the scientific community.

== Interacting proteins ==
There are a number predicted interacting proteins found in Y2H screens, such as exportin 1 (XPO1), ras homolog family member U (RHOU), deoxyhypusine hydroxylase/monooxygenase (DOHH), hepatocyte nuclear factor 4, alpha (HNF4A), leukocyte receptor cluster member 1 (LENG1), and ubiquitin C (UBC).

== Clinical significance ==
=== Disease association ===
Expression of c14orf119 is decreased in individuals with systemic lupus erythematosus (SLE) when compared with healthy individuals. Furthermore, expression of c14orf119 is increased in individuals with various types of lymphomas when compared to healthy individuals.
