= Hepatocyte nuclear factor 4 =

Protein family

Hepatocyte nuclear factor 4 alpha

Identifiers
- Symbol: HNF4A
- Alt. symbols: TCF14, MODY, MODY1
- NCBI gene: 3172
- HGNC: 5024
- OMIM: 600281
- PDB: 1M7W
- RefSeq: NM_001030004
- UniProt: P41235

Other data
- Locus: Chr. 20 q12-20q13.1
Search for
- Structures: Swiss-model
- Domains: InterPro

Hepatocyte nuclear factor 4 gamma

Identifiers
- Symbol: HNF4G
- NCBI gene: 3174
- HGNC: 5026
- OMIM: 605966
- PDB: 1LV2
- RefSeq: NM_004133
- UniProt: Q14541

Other data
- Locus: Chr. 8 q21-q22
Search for
- Structures: Swiss-model
- Domains: InterPro

HNF4 (Hepatocyte Nuclear Factor 4) is a nuclear receptor protein mostly expressed in the liver, gut, kidney, and pancreatic beta cells that is critical for liver development. In humans, there are two paralogs of HNF4, HNF4α and HNF4γ, encoded by two separate genes HNF4A and HNF4G respectively.

== Ligands ==
HNF4 was originally classified as an orphan receptor that exhibits constitutive transactivation activity apparently by being continuously bound to a variety of fatty acids. The existence of a ligand for HNF4 has been somewhat controversial, but linoleic acid (LA) has been identified as the endogenous ligand of native HNF4 expressed in mouse liver; the binding of LA to HNF4 is reversible.

The ligand binding domain of HNF4, as with other nuclear receptors, adopts a canonical alpha helical sandwich fold and interacts with co-activator proteins.

HNF4 binds to the consensus sequence AGGTCAaAGGTCA in order to activate transcription.

== Pathology ==
Mutations in the HNF4A gene have been linked to maturity onset diabetes of the young 1 (MODY1).

This seems to be caused by HNF4-a's role in the synthesis of SHBG, which is known to be severely diminished in patients with insulin-resistance.

== See also ==
- Hepatocyte nuclear factors
- Hepatocyte nuclear factor 4A
