= MODY 1 =

- This condition is inherited via autosomal dominant manner

MODY 1 or HNF4A-MODY is a form of maturity onset diabetes of the young.

MODY 1 is due to a loss-of-function mutation in the HNF4A (MODY1) gene on chromosome 12. This gene codes for hepatocyte nuclear factor 4-alpha (HNF4-α) protein also known as transcription factor 14 (TCF14). HNF4α controls function of HNF1α (see MODY 3; HNF1A) and perhaps HNF1β (MODY 5) as well. This transcription network plays a role in the early development of the pancreas, liver, and intestines. In the pancreas these genes influence expression of, among others, the genes for insulin, the principal glucose transporter (GLUT2), and several proteins involved in glucose and mitochondrial metabolism.

Although pancreatic beta cells produce adequate insulin in infancy, the capacity for insulin production declines thereafter. Diabetes (persistent hyperglycemia) typically develops by early adult years, but may not appear until later decades. The degree of insulin deficiency is slowly progressive. Many patients with MODY 1 are treated with sulfonylureas for years before insulin is required.

Liver effects are subtle and not clinically significant. Many people with this condition have low levels of triglycerides, lipoprotein(a), apolipoproteins AII and CIII.
