= MODY 6 =

- Other names: Maturity-Onset Diabetes of the Young, Type 6

MODY 6 or NEUROD1-MODY is a form of maturity onset diabetes of the young.

MODY 6 arises from mutations of the gene for the transcription factor referred to as neurogenic differentiation 1. The gene is on chromosome 2 in a region of the p arm known as IDDM7 because it includes genes affecting susceptibility to diabetes mellitus type 1 (NeuroD1). NeuroD1 promotes transcription of the insulin gene as well as some genes involved in formation of beta cells and parts of the nervous system.

This is also one of the rarer forms of MODY. Only 3 kindreds with mutations causing MODY6 have been identified so far. In both, some of the members had more typical type 2 diabetes rather than MODY, and the reasons for the difference of expression have not been worked out. Most of the family members with diabetes were diagnosed after age 40, but a few required insulin for blood sugar control.
