= KLF11 =

Protein-coding gene in the species Homo sapiens

Identifiers
- Aliases: KLF11, FKLF, FKLF1, MODY7, TIEG2, Tieg3, Kruppel-like factor 11, Kruppel like factor 11
- External IDs: OMIM: 603301; MGI: 2653368; GeneCards: KLF11
Available structures
PDB	Ortholog search: PDBe RCSB
PDB	List of PDB id codes 1PO4

Gene location (Human)
Chr.	Chromosome 2 (human)
Band	2p25.1	Start	10,042,849 bp
Band	2p25.1	End	10,054,836 bp

Gene location (Mouse)
Chr.	Chromosome 12 (mouse)
Band	12 A1.3|12 8.49 cM	Start	24,701,273 bp
Band	12 A1.3|12 8.49 cM	End	24,712,788 bp
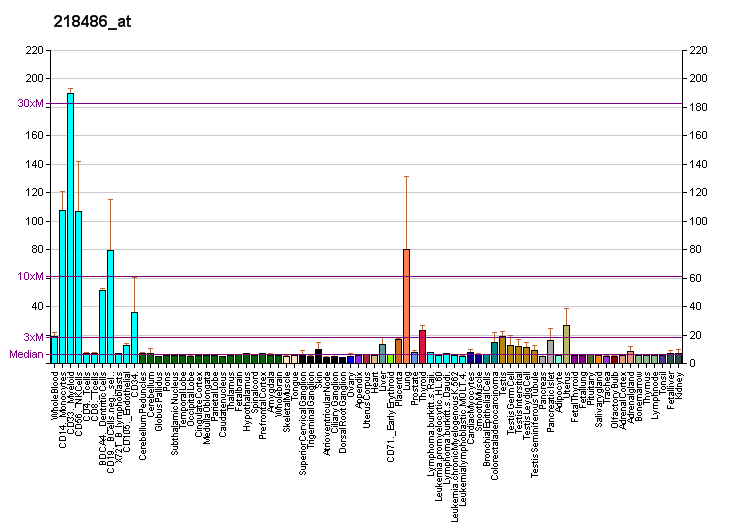
RNA expression pattern
Bgee	Human / Mouse (ortholog); Top expressed in: secondary oocyte; gonad; skin of thigh; testicle; monocyte; saphenous vein; skin of hip; gastric mucosa; amniotic fluid; abdominal fat / Top expressed in: zygote; secondary oocyte; superior cervical ganglion; hand; otolith organ; utricle; primary oocyte; gastrula; decidua; right lung lobe; More reference expression data
BioGPS	More reference expression data
Gene ontology
Molecular function	DNA-binding transcription factor activity; DNA binding; protein binding; metal ion binding; nucleic acid binding; DNA-binding transcription factor activity, RNA polymerase II-specific
Cellular component	nucleus; nucleoplasm; cytosol; focal adhesion; nuclear body
Biological process	positive regulation of apoptotic process; negative regulation of transcription, DNA-templated; regulation of transcription, DNA-templated; negative regulation of transcription by RNA polymerase II; transcription by RNA polymerase II; regulation of transcription involved in G1/S transition of mitotic cell cycle; transcription, DNA-templated; negative regulation of cell population proliferation; apoptotic process; cellular response to peptide; regulation of transcription by RNA polymerase II
Sources:Amigo / QuickGO
Orthologs
Databases	NCBI: entry; OMA: entry
Species	Human	Mouse
Entrez	8462	194655
Ensembl	ENSG00000172059	ENSMUSG00000020653
UniProt	O14901	Q8K1S5
RefSeq (mRNA)	NM_001177716; NM_001177718; NM_003597	NM_178357
RefSeq (protein)	NP_001171187; NP_001171189; NP_003588	NP_848134
Location (UCSC)	Chr 2: 10.04 – 10.05 Mb	Chr 12: 24.7 – 24.71 Mb
PubMed search
- Wikidata
View/Edit Human	View/Edit Mouse

Krueppel-like factor 11 is a protein that in humans is encoded by the KLF11 gene.

KLF11 is a mesoderm derived, zinc finger transcription factor in the Krüppel-like factor (KLF) family. It binds to SP1- like GC- rich sequences in epsilon and gamma globin gene promoters inhibiting cellular growth and causing apoptosis. In the regulation of genes, it is involved in cellular inflammation and differentiation, making it an essential factor in early embryonic development. This transcription factor binds to promoters of genes involved in cholesterol, prostaglandin, neurotransmitter, fat, and sugar metabolism, specifically pancreatic beta cell function. Defects in KLF11 affect glucose metabolism, insulin transcription, insulin processing, and insulin secretion which cause type 2 diabetes in adults and maturity-onset diabetes of the young type 7. These types of diabetes are caused by KLF11 interacting with co-repressors in the pancreatic islet beta cells. KLF11 has recently been shown to be involved in endometriosis since it regulated the expression of extracellular matrix genes. Its absence in extracellular matrix genes created a more fibrogenic response by the tissue. This was proved by creating a knockout model. The experiment showed that the absence of KLF11 showed higher amounts of fibrosis indicating that it prevents the growth of endometriotic lesions and inhibits pathological scarring.

== Interactions ==
KLF11 has been shown to interact with SIN3A.

== See also ==
- Krüppel-like factors
- Maturity onset diabetes of the young
