= MODY 4 =

- Specialty: Endocrinology

MODY 4 or PDX1-MODY is a form of maturity onset diabetes of the young.

MODY 4 arises from mutations of the PDX1 homeobox gene on chromosome 13. Pdx-1 is a transcription factor vital to the development of the embryonic pancreas. Even in adults it continues to play a role in the regulation and expression of genes for insulin, GLUT2, glucokinase, and somatostatin.

MODY 4 is so rare that only a single family has been well-studied. A child born with pancreatic agenesis (absence of the pancreas) was found to be homozygous for Pdx-1 mutations. A number of older relatives who were heterozygous had mild hyperglycemia or diabetes. None were severely insulin-deficient and all were controlled with either diet or oral hypoglycemic agents.
