= Hepatocyte nuclear factor 4 gamma =

Protein-coding gene in the species Homo sapiens

HNF4G
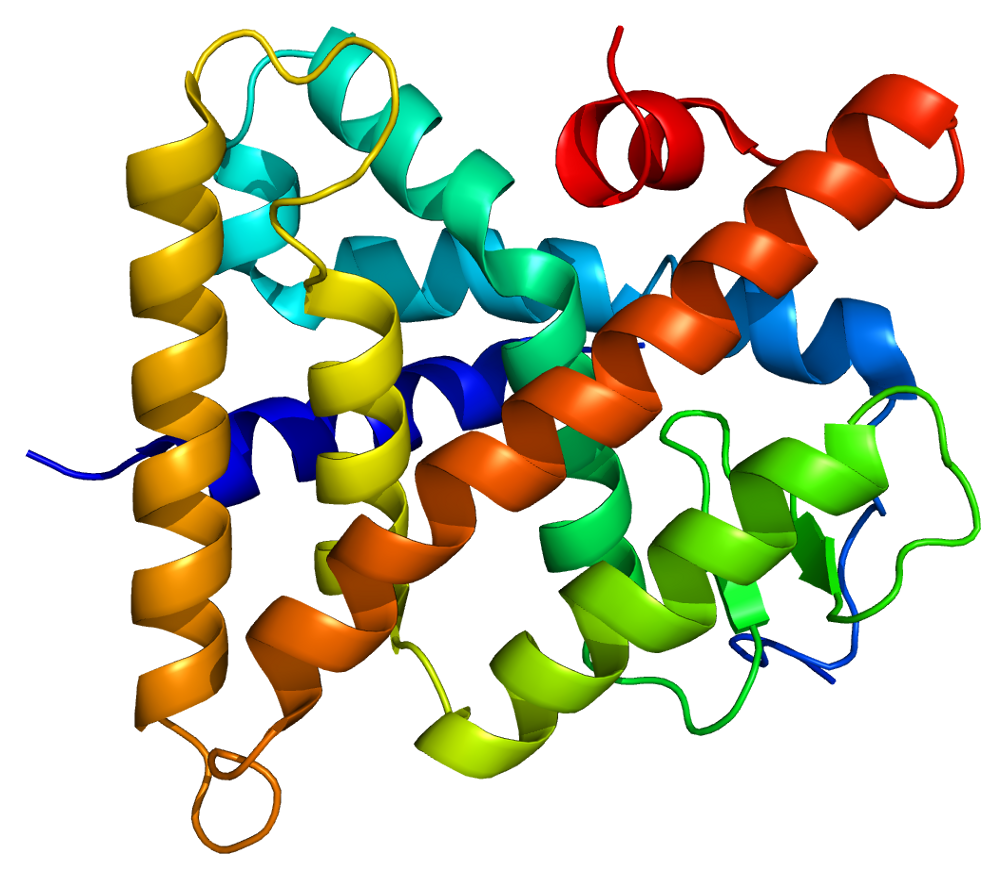

Identifiers
- Aliases: HNF4G, NR2A2, NR2A3, Hepatocyte nuclear factor 4 gamma
- External IDs: OMIM: 605966; MGI: 1353604; GeneCards: HNF4G
Available structures
PDB	Ortholog search: PDBe RCSB
PDB	List of PDB id codes 1LV2

Gene location (Human)
Chr.	Chromosome 8 (human)
Band	8q21.13	Start	75,407,914 bp
Band	8q21.13	End	75,566,834 bp

Gene location (Mouse)
Chr.	Chromosome 3 (mouse)
Band	3|3 A1	Start	3,573,090 bp
Band	3|3 A1	End	3,723,112 bp
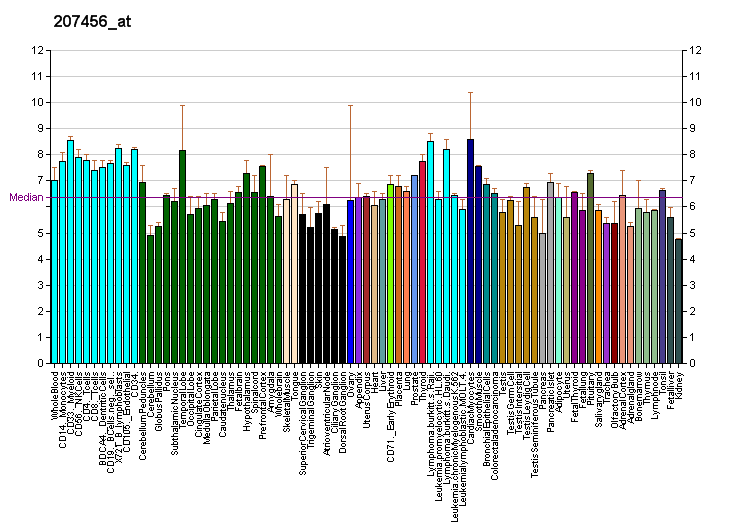
RNA expression pattern
Bgee	Human / Mouse (ortholog); Top expressed in: jejunal mucosa; duodenum; rectum; mucosa of colon; mucosa of ileum; mucosa of sigmoid colon; mucosa of transverse colon; gallbladder; right lobe of liver; body of pancreas / Top expressed in: duodenum; jejunum; urethra; ileum; epithelium of small intestine; male urethra; right kidney; proximal tubule; intestinal villus; migratory enteric neural crest cell; More reference expression data
BioGPS	More reference expression data
Gene ontology
Molecular function	DNA-binding transcription factor activity; steroid hormone receptor activity; sequence-specific DNA binding; DNA binding; nuclear receptor activity; zinc ion binding; metal ion binding; RNA polymerase II cis-regulatory region sequence-specific DNA binding; DNA-binding transcription activator activity, RNA polymerase II-specific; DNA-binding transcription factor activity, RNA polymerase II-specific
Cellular component	nucleus; nucleoplasm
Biological process	regulation of transcription by RNA polymerase II; intracellular receptor signaling pathway; transcription initiation from RNA polymerase II promoter; regulation of transcription, DNA-templated; transcription, DNA-templated; steroid hormone mediated signaling pathway; positive regulation of transcription by RNA polymerase II
Sources:Amigo / QuickGO
Orthologs
Databases	NCBI: entry; OMA: entry
Species	Human	Mouse
Entrez	3174	30942
Ensembl	ENSG00000164749	ENSMUSG00000017688
UniProt	Q14541	Q9WUU6
RefSeq (mRNA)	NM_004133; NM_001330561	NM_013920; NM_001395870
RefSeq (protein)	NP_001317490; NP_004124	NP_038948; NP_001382799
Location (UCSC)	Chr 8: 75.41 – 75.57 Mb	Chr 3: 3.57 – 3.72 Mb
PubMed search
- Wikidata
View/Edit Human	View/Edit Mouse

Hepatocyte nuclear factor 4 gamma (HNF4G) also known as NR2A2 (nuclear receptor subfamily 2, group A, member 2) is a nuclear receptor that in humans is encoded by the HNF4G gene.

== Function ==
HNF4G is a transcription factor that has been shown to play a significant role in intestinal epithelial cell differentiation and function. Research using integrative multi-omics analysis of intestinal organoid differentiation has revealed that HNF4G acts as a master regulator of gene regulation in differentiation towards the enterocyte lineage. The study demonstrated widespread binding to promoters and enhancers that are activated in enterocytes, and that the loss of Hnf4g results in a partial loss of enterocyte differentiation, indicating its importance in maintaining the enterocyte lineage.

== See also ==
- Hepatocyte nuclear factor 4
- Hepatocyte nuclear factors
