= Intragenic =

Intragenic may refer to:

- Intragenic, a proposed designation for genetic modifications which originate in a common genome
- Intragenic region, a term from which intron is derived
