= Hepatocyte nuclear factor 4 alpha =

Protein found in humans

HNF4A
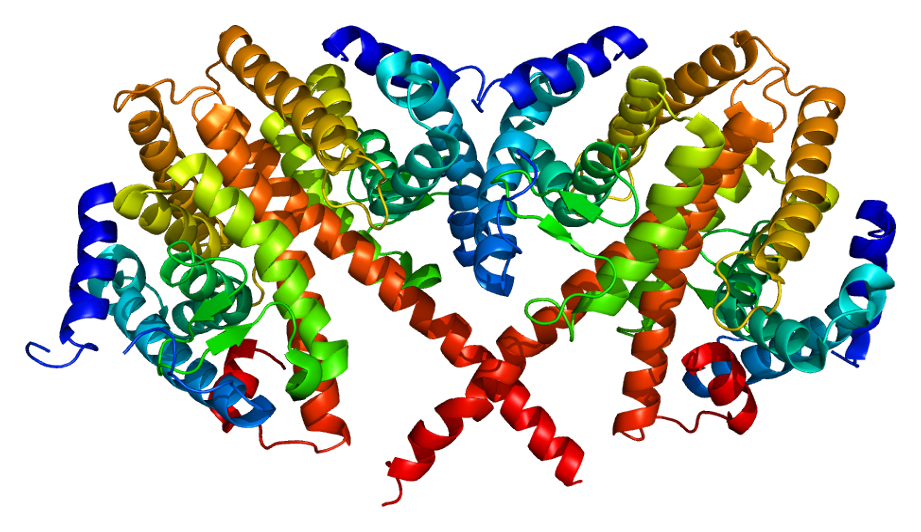

Identifiers
- Aliases: HNF4A, HNF4, HNF4a7, HNF4a8, HNF4a9, HNF4alpha, MODY, MODY1, NR2A1, NR2A21, TCF, TCF14, FRTS4, Hepatocyte nuclear factor 4 alpha, TCF-14
- External IDs: OMIM: 600281; MGI: 109128; GeneCards: HNF4A
Available structures
PDB	Ortholog search: PDBe RCSB
PDB	List of PDB id codes 1PZL, 3CBB, 3FS1, 4B7W, 4IQR

Gene location (Human)
Chr.	Chromosome 20 (human)
Band	20q13.12	Start	44,355,700 bp
Band	20q13.12	End	44,432,845 bp

Gene location (Mouse)
Chr.	Chromosome 2 (mouse)
Band	2 H3|2 84.32 cM	Start	163,348,728 bp
Band	2 H3|2 84.32 cM	End	163,414,830 bp
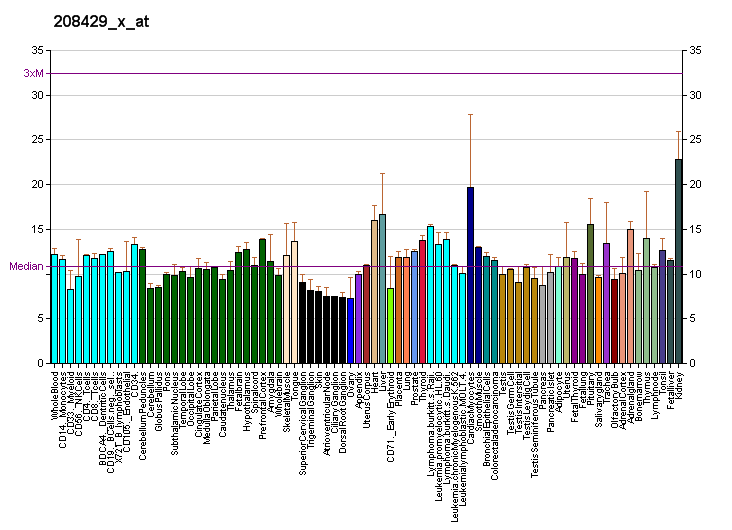

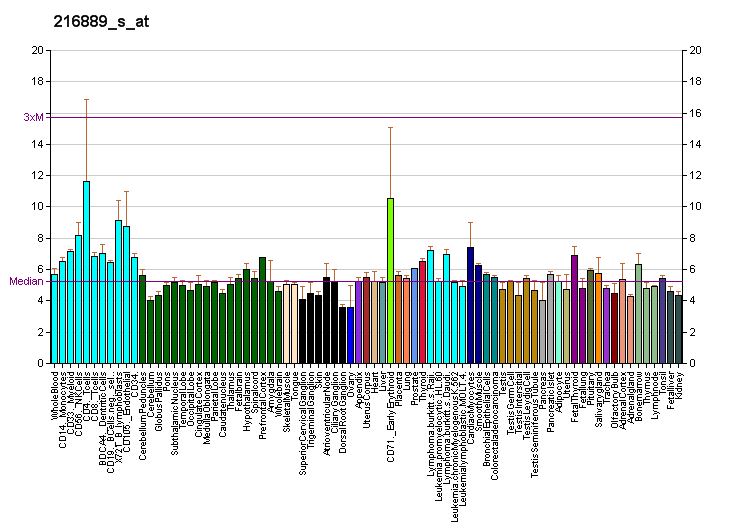

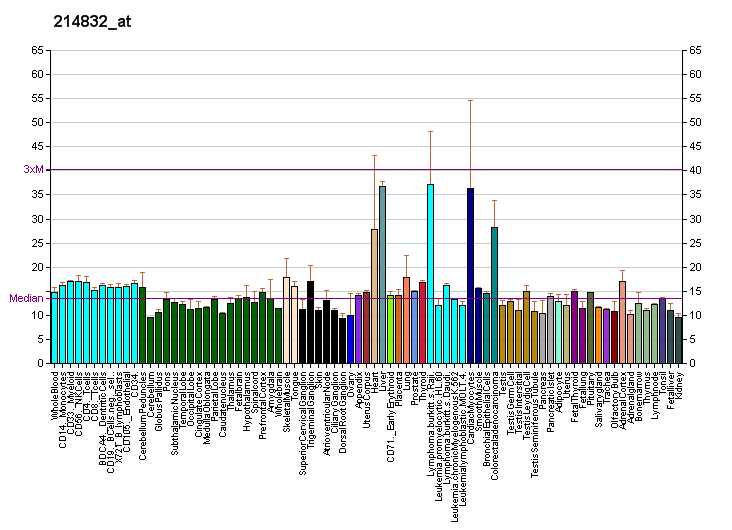
RNA expression pattern
Bgee	Human / Mouse (ortholog); Top expressed in: right lobe of liver; mucosa of transverse colon; duodenum; rectum; mucosa of sigmoid colon; jejunal mucosa; human kidney; mucosa of ileum; islet of Langerhans; body of pancreas / Top expressed in: Paneth cell; left colon; jejunum; crypt of lieberkuhn of small intestine; left lobe of liver; duodenum; yolk sac; pyloric antrum; human kidney; right kidney; More reference expression data
BioGPS	More reference expression data
Gene ontology
Molecular function	DNA binding; sequence-specific DNA binding; DNA-binding transcription factor activity; DNA-binding transcription activator activity, RNA polymerase II-specific; zinc ion binding; metal ion binding; steroid hormone receptor activity; nuclear receptor activity; protein binding; transcription factor activity, RNA polymerase II distal enhancer sequence-specific binding; signaling receptor binding; fatty acid binding; protein homodimerization activity; RNA polymerase II cis-regulatory region sequence-specific DNA binding; DNA-binding transcription factor activity, RNA polymerase II-specific
Cellular component	nucleus; cytoplasm; nucleoplasm
Biological process	triglyceride homeostasis; ornithine metabolic process; phospholipid homeostasis; regulation of transcription, DNA-templated; SMAD protein signal transduction; glucose homeostasis; regulation of insulin secretion; lipid metabolism; regulation of transcription by RNA polymerase II; signal transduction involved in regulation of gene expression; sex differentiation; blood coagulation; response to glucose; transcription, DNA-templated; positive regulation of transcription, DNA-templated; regulation of lipid metabolic process; intracellular receptor signaling pathway; regulation of growth hormone receptor signaling pathway; negative regulation of cell growth; lipid homeostasis; xenobiotic metabolic process; transcription initiation from RNA polymerase II promoter; regulation of gastrulation; steroid hormone mediated signaling pathway; positive regulation of transcription by RNA polymerase II; negative regulation of cell population proliferation; cholesterol homeostasis; type B pancreatic cell development; hepatocyte differentiation; regulation of circadian rhythm; negative regulation of transcription, DNA-templated; rhythmic process
Sources:Amigo / QuickGO
Orthologs
Databases	NCBI: entry; OMA: entry
Species	Human	Mouse
Entrez	3172	15378
Ensembl	ENSG00000101076	ENSMUSG00000017950
UniProt	P41235	P49698
RefSeq (mRNA)	NM_000457; NM_001030003; NM_001030004; NM_001258355; NM_001287182 NM_001287183; NM_001287184; NM_175914; NM_178849; NM_178850	NM_008261; NM_001312906; NM_001312907
RefSeq (protein)	NP_000448; NP_001025174; NP_001025175; NP_001245284; NP_001274111 NP_001274112; NP_001274113; NP_787110; NP_849180; NP_849181	NP_001299835; NP_001299836; NP_032287
Location (UCSC)	Chr 20: 44.36 – 44.43 Mb	Chr 2: 163.35 – 163.41 Mb
PubMed search
- Wikidata
View/Edit Human	View/Edit Mouse

Hepatocyte nuclear factor 4 alpha (HNF4A) also known as NR2A1 (nuclear receptor subfamily 2, group A, member 1) is a nuclear receptor that in humans is encoded by the HNF4A gene.

== Function ==
HNF-4α is a nuclear transcription factor that binds DNA as a homodimer. The encoded protein controls the expression of several genes, including hepatocyte nuclear factor 1 alpha, a transcription factor that regulates the expression of several hepatic genes. This gene plays a role in development of the liver, kidney, and intestines. Alternative splicing of this gene results in multiple transcript variants.

HNF4A is required for the PXR and CAR-mediated transcriptional activation of CYP3A4. Genetic mutations in the HNF4A gene can influence the activity of HNF4α's downstream proteins such as CYP2D6, in vitro and in vivo.

The alkaloid berberine upregulates HNF4A expression.

This gene plays a pivotal role in the expression and synthesis of SHBG, an important glycoprotein made primarily in the liver, which in addition to lowering insulin-resistance also reduces levels of free estrogen as-well as prolonging the half-life of testosterone.

Function of HNF4A gene can be effectively examined by siRNA knockdown based on an independent validation.

== Clinical significance ==
Mutations in the HNF4A gene are associated with a form of diabetes called maturity onset diabetes of the young (MODY), specifically MODY 1. At least 56 disease-causing mutations in this gene have been discovered.

Increased amplification of hepatocyte nuclear factor 4 alpha has been observed in colorectal cancer.

It has also associations with the appearance of Fanconi syndrome phenotypes which occurs due to a missense mutation of the gene.

== Interactions ==
Hepatocyte nuclear factor 4 alpha has been shown to interact with:

- Beta-catenin,
- CREB binding protein,
- MED1,
- MED14,
- Small heterodimer partner,
- Testicular receptor 4.

== See also ==
- Hepatocyte nuclear factor 4
- Hepatocyte nuclear factors
