= MODY 2 =

- Specialty: Endocrinology

MODY 2 or GCK-MODY is a form of maturity-onset diabetes of the young. It is due to any of several mutations in the GCK gene (AKA MODY2) on human chromosome 7 for glucokinase. Glucokinase serves as the glucose sensor for the pancreatic beta cell. Normal glucokinase triggers insulin secretion as the glucose exceeds about 90 mg/dl (5 mM). These loss-of-function mutations result in a glucokinase molecule that is less sensitive or less responsive to rising levels of glucose. The beta cells in MODY 2 have a normal ability to make and secrete insulin, but do so only above an abnormally high threshold (e.g., 126–144 mg/dl, or 7-8 mM). This produces a chronic, mild increase in blood sugar, which is usually asymptomatic. It is usually detected by accidental discovery of mildly elevated blood sugar (e.g., during pregnancy screening). An oral glucose tolerance test is much less abnormal than would be expected from the impaired (elevated) fasting blood sugar, since insulin secretion is usually normal once the glucose has exceeded the threshold for that specific variant of the glucokinase enzyme.

The degree of blood sugar elevation does not worsen rapidly with age, and long-term diabetic complications are rare. In healthy children and adults, a high blood sugar level can be avoided by a healthy diet and exercise, primarily avoiding large amounts of carbohydrates. However, as people who have MODY2 enter their 50s and 60s, even though they continue to eat a healthy diet and exercise, they sometimes are unable to control a high blood sugar level with these measures. In these cases, many medicines for type II diabetes mellitus are not effective, because MODY2 does not cause insulin resistance. Repaglinide (Prandin) can help the body regulate the amount of glucose in the blood by stimulating the pancreas to release insulin before meals. In some cases, the baseline glucose levels are too high as well and insulin is required.

MODY2 is an autosomal dominant condition. Autosomal dominance refers to a single, abnormal gene on one of the first 22 nonsex chromosomes from either parent which can cause an autosomal disorder. Dominant inheritance means an abnormal gene from one parent is capable of causing disease, even though the matching gene from the other parent is normal. The abnormal gene "dominates" the pair of genes. If just one parent has a dominant gene defect, each child has a 50% chance of inheriting the disorder.

This type of MODY demonstrates the common circulation but complex interplay between maternal and fetal metabolism and hormone signals in the determination of fetal size. A small number of infants will have a new mutation not present in their mothers. If the mother is affected and the fetus is not, the maternal glucose will be somewhat high and the normal pancreas of the fetus will generate more insulin to compensate, resulting in a large infant. If the fetus is affected but mother is not, glucose will be normal and fetal insulin production will be low, resulting in intrauterine growth retardation. Finally, if both mother and fetus have the disease, the two defects will offset each other and fetal size will be unaffected.

When both GCK genes are affected the diabetes appears earlier and the hyperglycemia is more severe. A form of permanent neonatal diabetes has been caused by homozygous mutations in the GCK gene.
