= Maturity-onset diabetes of the young =

Maturity-onset diabetes of the young (MODY)
- Other names: Monogenic diabetes
- Specialty: Endocrinology
- Frequency: 0.03%

Maturity-onset diabetes of the young (MODY) refers to any of several hereditary forms of diabetes mellitus caused by mutations in an autosomal dominant gene disrupting insulin production. Along with neonatal diabetes, MODY is a form of the conditions known as monogenic diabetes. While the more common types of diabetes (especially type 1 and type 2) involve more complex combinations of causes involving multiple genes and environmental factors, each form of MODY is caused by changes to a single gene (monogenic). HNF1A-MODY (MODY 3) are the most common forms.

Robert Tattersall and Stefan Fajans initially identified the phenomenon known as maturity onset diabetes of the young in a classic study published in the journal Diabetes in 1975.

== Signs and symptoms ==
MODY accounts for at least 1-5% of all diagnoses of diabetes mellitus, though 50-90% of cases are estimated to be misdiagnosed as type 1, or type 2 diabetes. Estimated prevalence rates indicate 1 per 10,000 in adults, and 1 per 23,000 in children. 50% of first-degree relatives will inherit the same mutation, giving them a greater than 95% lifetime risk of developing MODY themselves. For this reason, correct diagnosis of this condition is important. Typically patients present with a strong family history of diabetes (i.e.: presence of diabetes before the age of 25 in two consecutive generations).

There are two general types of clinical presentation.

- Some forms of MODY produce significant hyperglycemia and the typical signs and symptoms of diabetes: increased thirst and urination (polydipsia and polyuria).
- In contrast, many people with MODY have no signs or symptoms and are diagnosed either by accident, when a high glucose is discovered during testing for other reasons, or screening of relatives of a person discovered to have diabetes. Discovery of mild hyperglycemia during a routine glucose tolerance test for pregnancy is particularly characteristic.

While the goals of diabetes management are the same no matter what type, there are two primary advantages of confirming a diagnosis of MODY.

- Insulin may not be necessary and it may be possible to switch a person from insulin injections to oral agents without loss of glycemic control.
- It may prompt screening of relatives and so help identify other cases in family members.

As it occurs infrequently, many cases of MODY are initially assumed to be more common forms of diabetes: type 1 if the patient is young and not overweight, type 2 if the patient is overweight, or gestational diabetes if the patient is pregnant. Standard diabetes treatments (insulin for type 1 and gestational diabetes, and oral hypoglycemic agents for type 2) are often initiated before the doctor suspects a more unusual form of diabetes.

== Pathophysiology ==
The recognised forms of MODY are all due to ineffective insulin production or release by pancreatic beta cells. Several of the defects are mutations of transcription factor genes. One form is due to mutations of the glucokinase gene. For each form of MODY, multiple specific mutations involving different amino acid substitutions have been discovered. In some cases, there are significant differences in the activity of the mutant gene product that contribute to variations in the clinical features of the diabetes (such as degree of insulin deficiency or age of onset).

== Diagnosis ==
The following characteristics suggest the possibility of a diagnosis of MODY in hyperglycemic and diabetic patients:

- Mild to moderate hyperglycemia (typically 130–250 mg/dL, or 7–14 mmol/L) discovered before 25 years of age. However, anyone under 50 can develop MODY.
- A first-degree relative with a similar degree of diabetes.
- Absence of positive antibodies or other autoimmunity (e.g., thyroiditis) in patient and family. However, Urbanova et al. found that about one quarter of Central European MODY patients are positive for islet cell autoantibodies (GABA and IA2A). Their expression is transient but highly prevalent. The autoantibodies were found in patients with delayed diabetes onset, and in times of insufficient diabetes control. The islet cell autoantibodies are absent in MODY in at least some populations (Japanese, Britons).
- Persistence of a low insulin requirement (e.g., less than 0.5 u/kg/day) past the usual "honeymoon" period.
- Normal insulin levels (e.g. 2.6-24.9)
- Absence of obesity (although overweight or obese people can get MODY) or other problems associated with type 2 diabetes or metabolic syndrome (e.g., hypertension, hyperlipidemia, polyendocrine metabolic ovarian syndrome (PMOS)).
- Insulin resistance very rarely happens.
- Cystic kidney disease in patient or close relatives.
- Non-transient neonatal diabetes, or apparent type 1 diabetes with onset before six months of age.
- Liver adenoma or hepatocellular carcinoma in MODY type 3
- Renal cysts, rudimentary or bicornuate uterus, vaginal aplasia, absence of the vas deferens, epidymal cysts in MODY type 5

The diagnosis of MODY is confirmed by specific gene testing available through commercial laboratories.

=== Classification ===
==== Heterozygous ====
MODY is inherited in an autosomal dominant fashion, and most patients therefore have other members of the family with diabetes; penetrance differs between the types (from 40% to 90%).

Type	OMIM	Gene/protein	Description
HNF4A-MODY (MODY 1)	125850	hepatocyte nuclear factor 4α	Due to a loss-of-function mutation in the HNF4α gene. 5%–10% cases.
GCK-MODY (MODY 2)	125851	glucokinase	Due to any of several mutations in the GCK gene. 30%–70% cases. Mild fasting hyperglycemia throughout life. Small rise on glucose loading. Patients do not tend to get diabetes complications and do not require treatment outside of pregnancy.
HNF1A-MODY (MODY 3)	600496	hepatocyte nuclear factor 1α	Mutations of the HNF1α gene (a homeobox gene). 30%–70% of cases. Most common type of MODY in populations with European ancestry. Tend to be responsive to sulfonylureas. Low renal threshold for glucose.
PDX1-MODY (MODY 4)	606392	insulin promoter factor-1	Mutations of the IPF1 homeobox (Pdx1) gene. < 1% cases. Associated with pancreatic agenesis in homozygotes and occasionally in heterozygotes.
HNF1B-MODY (MODY 5)	137920	hepatocyte nuclear factor 1β	One of the less common forms of MODY, with some distinctive clinical features, including atrophy of the pancreas and several forms of renal disease. Defect in HNF-1 beta gene. 5%–10% cases.
NEUROD1-MODY (MODY 6)	606394	neurogenic differentiation 1	Mutations of the gene for the transcription factor referred to as neurogenic differentiation 1. Very rare: 5 families reported to date.
KLF11-MODY (MODY 7)	610508	Krüppel-like factor 11	KLF11 has been associated with a form of diabetes that has been characterized as "MODY7" by OMIM.
CEL-MODY MODY 8	609812	Bile salt dependent lipase	CEL has been associated with a form of diabetes that has been characterized as "MODY8" by OMIM. It is very rare with five families reported to date. It is associated with exocrine pancreatic dysfunction.
PAX4-MODY MODY 9	612225	PAX4	Pax4 is a transcription factor. MODY 9 is a very rare medical condition.
INS-MODY MODY 10	613370	INS	Mutations in the insulin gene. Usually associated with neonatal diabetes. Rare < 1% cases.
BLK-MODY MODY 11	613375	BLK	Mutated B-lymphocyte tyrosine kinase, which is also present in pancreatic islet cells. Very rare.
ABCC8-MODY MODY 12	621196	ABCC8	encodes the sulfonylurea receptor 1 (SUR1) subunit of the ATP-sensitive potassium channel (K_{ATP}), which is highly expressed in pancreatic β-cells. Very rare, responds to sulfonylurea treatment
KCNJ11-MODY MODY 13	616329	KCNJ11	Kir6.2 subunit of the hetero-octameric K_{ATP} channel, which is highly expressed in pancreatic β-cells. Very rare, responds to sulfonylurea treatment
AAPL1-MODY MODY 14	616511	APPL1	Mutated anchor protein in the insulin signalling pathway. Newly discovered.

A newly discovered monogenetic form of diabetes is marked by a missense variant in the RyR2 gene. It has not yet received a MODY type.

==== Homozygous ====
By definition, the forms of MODY are autosomal dominant, requiring only one abnormal gene to produce the disease; the severity of the disease is moderated by the presence of a second, normal allele which presumably functions normally. However, conditions involving people carrying two abnormal alleles have been identified. Unsurprisingly, combined (homozygous) defects of these genes are much rarer and much more severe in their effects.

- MODY2: Homozygous glucokinase deficiency causes severe congenital insulin deficiency resulting in persistent neonatal diabetes mellitus. About 6 cases have been reported worldwide. All have required insulin treatment from shortly after birth. The condition does not seem to improve with age.
- MODY4: Homozygous IPF1 results in failure of the pancreas to form. Congenital absence of the pancreas, termed pancreatic agenesis, involves deficiency of both endocrine and exocrine functions of the pancreas.

Homozygous mutations in the other forms have not yet been described. Those mutations for which a homozygous form has not been described may be extremely rare, may result in clinical problems not yet recognized as connected to the monogenic disorder, or may be lethal for a fetus and not result in a viable child.

== Treatment ==
In some forms of MODY, standard treatment is appropriate, though exceptions occur:

- In MODY2, oral agents are relatively ineffective, however most patients are managed conservatively through diet and exercise.
- In MODY1 and MODY3, sulfonylureas are usually very effective, delaying the need for insulin treatment.
- Sulfonylureas are effective in the K_{ATP} channel forms of neonatal-onset diabetes. The mouse model of MODY diabetes suggested that the reduced clearance of sulfonylureas stands behind their therapeutic success in human MODY patients, but Urbanova et al. found that human MODY patients respond differently to the mouse model and that there was no consistent decrease in the clearance of sulfonylureas in randomly selected HNF1A-MODY and HNF4A-MODY patients.

Chronic hyperglycemia due to any cause can eventually cause blood vessel damage and the microvascular complications of diabetes. The principal treatment goals for people with MODY — keeping the blood sugars as close to normal as possible ("good glycemic control"), while minimizing other vascular risk factors — are the same for all known forms of diabetes.

The tools for management are similar for all forms of diabetes: blood testing, changes in diet, physical exercise, oral hypoglycemic agents, and insulin injections. In many cases these goals can be achieved more easily with MODY than with ordinary types 1 and 2 diabetes. Some people with MODY may require insulin injections to achieve the same glycemic control that another person may attain with careful eating or an oral medication.

When oral hypoglycemic agents are used in MODY, the sulfonylureas remain the oral medication of first resort. When compared to patients with type 2 diabetes, MODY patients are often more sensitive to sulphonylureas, such that a lower dose should be used to initiate treatment to avoid hypoglycaemia. Patients with MODY less often suffer from obesity and insulin resistance than those with ordinary type 2 diabetes (for whom insulin sensitizers like metformin or the thiazolidinediones are often preferred over the sulfonylureas).

== Epidemiology ==
According to data from Saxony, Germany, MODY was responsible for 2.4% of diabetes incidence in children younger than 15 years.

== History ==
The term MODY dates back to 1964, when diabetes mellitus was considered to have two main forms: juvenile-onset and maturity-onset, which roughly corresponded to what we now call type 1 and type 2. MODY was originally applied to any child or young adult who had persistent, asymptomatic hyperglycemia without progression to diabetic ketosis or ketoacidosis. In retrospect we can now recognize that this category covered a heterogeneous collection of disorders which included cases of dominantly inherited diabetes (the topic of this article, still called MODY today), as well as cases of what we would now call type 2 diabetes occurring in childhood or adolescence, and a few even rarer types of hyperglycemia (e.g., mitochondrial diabetes or mutant insulin). Many of these patients were treated with sulfonylureas with varying degrees of success.

The current usage of the term MODY dates from a case report published in 1974.

Since the 1990s, as the understanding of the pathophysiology of diabetes has improved, the concept and usage of MODY have become refined and narrower. It is now used as a synonym for dominantly inherited, monogenic defects of insulin secretion occurring at any age, and no longer includes any forms of type 2 diabetes.

== See also ==
- Genetic causes of type 2 diabetes
- Genetics of obesity
