= ONECUT1 =

Protein-coding gene in the species Homo sapiens

Identifiers
- Aliases: ONECUT1, HNF-6, HNF6, HNF6A, one cut homeobox 1
- External IDs: OMIM: 604164; MGI: 1196423; GeneCards: ONECUT1
Available structures
PDB	Ortholog search: PDBe RCSB
PDB	List of PDB id codes 1S7E

Gene location (Human)
Chr.	Chromosome 15 (human)
Band	15q21.3	Start	52,755,053 bp
Band	15q21.3	End	52,791,078 bp

Gene location (Mouse)
Chr.	Chromosome 9 (mouse)
Band	9 D|9 41.93 cM	Start	74,769,203 bp
Band	9 D|9 41.93 cM	End	74,799,063 bp
RNA expression pattern
Bgee	Human / Mouse (ortholog); Top expressed in: body of pancreas; right lobe of liver; gallbladder; testicle; islet of Langerhans; buccal mucosa cell; gonad; right testis; left testis; granulocyte / Top expressed in: female urethra; wall of urinary bladder; mucosa of urinary bladder; urothelium; transitional epithelium of urinary bladder; liver; stroma of kidney; epithelium of female urethra; greater petrosal nerve; secondary oocyte; More reference expression data
BioGPS	n/a
Gene ontology
Molecular function	DNA binding; DNA-binding transcription factor activity; DNA-binding transcription activator activity, RNA polymerase II-specific; DNA-binding transcription factor activity, RNA polymerase II-specific
Cellular component	nucleus
Biological process	Notch signaling pathway; epithelial cell development; cell differentiation; cell fate commitment; endoderm development; regulation of transcription, DNA-templated; positive regulation of cell migration; regulation of transcription by RNA polymerase II; anatomical structure morphogenesis; negative regulation of transforming growth factor beta receptor signaling pathway; spleen development; transcription by RNA polymerase II; transcription, DNA-templated; regulation of cell-matrix adhesion; glucose metabolic process; pancreas development; liver development; B cell differentiation; positive regulation of transcription by RNA polymerase II; organism system development; endocrine pancreas development; cilium assembly
Sources:Amigo / QuickGO
Orthologs
Databases	NCBI: entry; OMA: entry
Species	Human	Mouse
Entrez	3175	15379
Ensembl	ENSG00000169856	ENSMUSG00000043013
UniProt	Q9UBC0	O08755
RefSeq (mRNA)	NM_004498	NM_008262
RefSeq (protein)	NP_004489	NP_032288
Location (UCSC)	Chr 15: 52.76 – 52.79 Mb	Chr 9: 74.77 – 74.8 Mb
PubMed search
- Wikidata
View/Edit Human	View/Edit Mouse

One cut homeobox 1 is a protein that in humans is encoded by the ONECUT1 gene.

== Structure ==
This gene encodes a member of the Cut homeobox family of transcription factors.

== Function ==
Expression of the encoded protein is enriched in the liver, where it stimulates transcription of liver-expressed genes, and antagonizes glucocorticoid-stimulated gene transcription. This gene may influence a variety of cellular processes including glucose metabolism, cell cycle regulation, and it may also be associated with cancer. It is important for the differentiation of pancreas endocrine cells.

== Clinical significance ==
Mutations in ONECUT1 are involved in juvenile diabetes. Alternative splicing results in multiple transcript variants.
