= HNF1A =

Protein-coding gene in humans

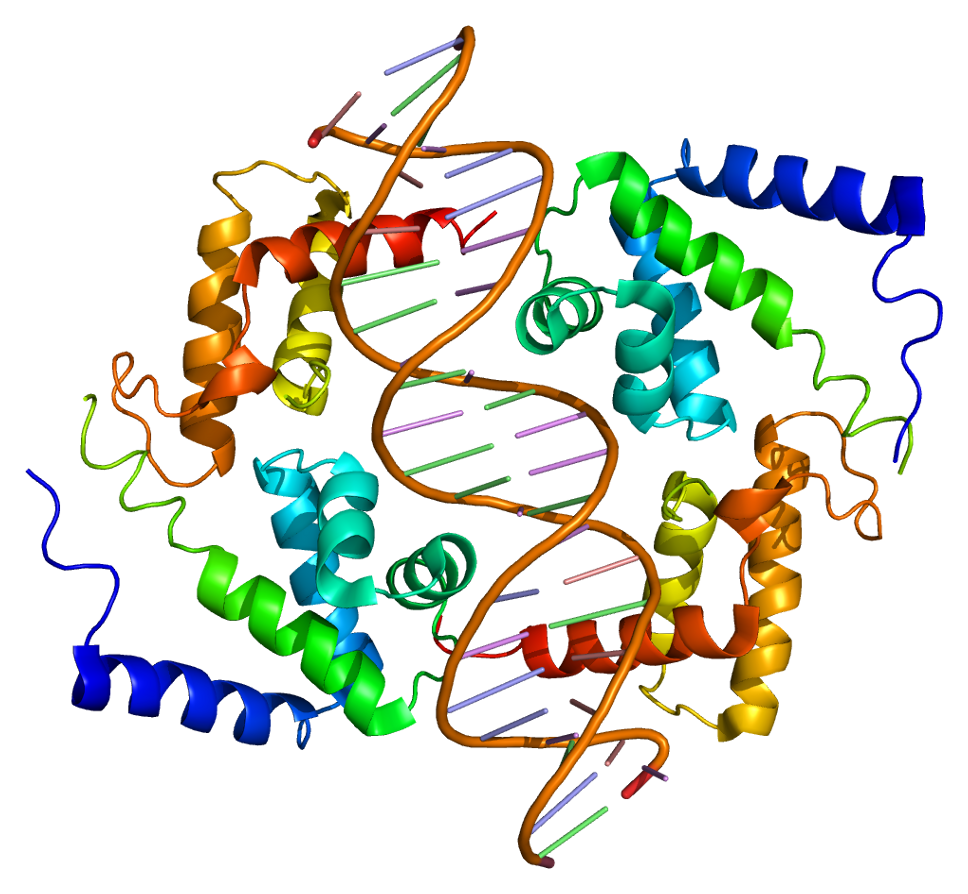

Identifiers
- Aliases: HNF1A, HNF-1A, HNF1, IDDM20, LFB1, MODY3, TCF-1, TCF1, HNF1 homeobox A, HNF4A, HNF1alpha
- External IDs: OMIM: 142410; MGI: 98504; GeneCards: HNF1A
Available structures
PDB	Ortholog search: PDBe RCSB
PDB	List of PDB id codes 1IC8, 2GYP

Gene location (Human)
Chr.	Chromosome 12 (human)
Band	12q24.31	Start	120,978,543 bp
Band	12q24.31	End	121,002,512 bp

Gene location (Mouse)
Chr.	Chromosome 5 (mouse)
Band	5 55.99 cM|5 F	Start	115,087,039 bp
Band	5 55.99 cM|5 F	End	115,109,153 bp
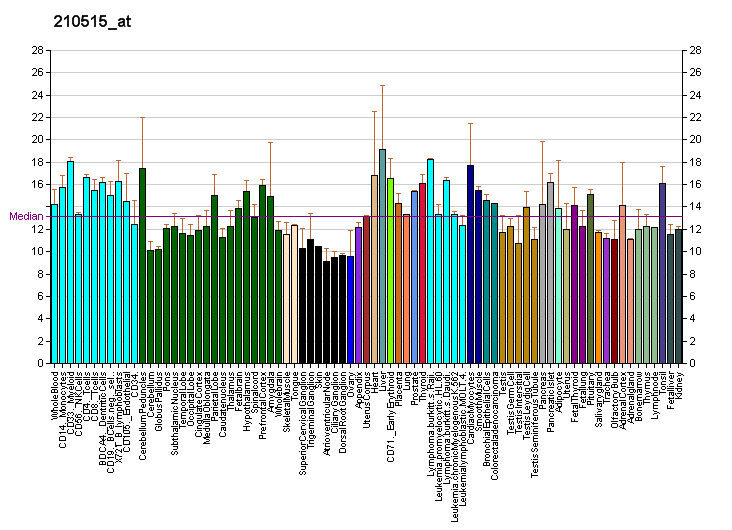
RNA expression pattern
Bgee	Human / Mouse (ortholog); Top expressed in: right lobe of liver; mucosa of transverse colon; pancreatic ductal cell; human kidney; duodenum; body of pancreas; oocyte; jejunal mucosa; testicle; secondary oocyte / Top expressed in: right kidney; yolk sac; female urethra; proximal tubule; embryo; supraoptic nucleus; stomach; embryo; blastocyst; duodenum; More reference expression data
BioGPS	More reference expression data
Gene ontology
Molecular function	DNA binding; protein dimerization activity; protein homodimerization activity; DNA-binding transcription factor activity; DNA-binding transcription activator activity, RNA polymerase II-specific; protein binding; protein heterodimerization activity; RNA polymerase II transcription regulatory region sequence-specific DNA binding; DNA-binding transcription factor activity, RNA polymerase II-specific
Cellular component	cytoplasm; nucleus; protein-containing complex
Biological process	regulation of transcription, DNA-templated; glucose homeostasis; regulation of transcription by RNA polymerase II; renal glucose absorption; insulin secretion; positive regulation of transcription initiation from RNA polymerase II promoter; transcription, DNA-templated; positive regulation of transcription, DNA-templated; glucose import; regulation of pronephros size; positive regulation of transcription by RNA polymerase II; transcription by RNA polymerase II; natural killer cell differentiation; liver development; pancreas development
Sources:Amigo / QuickGO
Orthologs
Databases	NCBI: entry; OMA: entry
Species	Human	Mouse
Entrez	6927	21405
Ensembl	ENSG00000135100	ENSMUSG00000029556
UniProt	P20823	P22361
RefSeq (mRNA)	NM_000545; NM_001306179	NM_009327
RefSeq (protein)	NP_000536; NP_001293108; NP_000536.5; NP_001293108.1	NP_033353
Location (UCSC)	Chr 12: 120.98 – 121 Mb	Chr 5: 115.09 – 115.11 Mb
PubMed search
- Wikidata
View/Edit Human	View/Edit Mouse

HNF1 homeobox A (hepatocyte nuclear factor 1 homeobox A), also known as HNF1A, is a human gene on chromosome 12. It is ubiquitously expressed in many tissues and cell types. The protein encoded by this gene is a transcription factor that is highly expressed in the liver and is involved in the regulation of the expression of several liver-specific genes. Mutations in the HNF1A gene have been known to cause diabetes. The HNF1A gene also contains a SNP associated with increased risk of coronary artery disease.

== Structure ==
=== Gene ===
The HNF1A gene resides on chromosome 12 at the band 12q24.2 and contains 10 exons. This gene produces 8 isoforms through alternative splicing.

=== Protein ===
This protein belongs to the HNF1 homeobox family. It contains 3 functional domains: an N-terminal dimerization domain (residues 1–32), a bipartite DNA-binding motif containing an atypical POU-homeodomain (residues 98–280), and a C-terminal transactivation domain (residues 281–631). There is also a flexible linker (residues 33–97) which connects the dimerization and DNA binding domains. Crystal structures have been solved for the dimerization domain, which forms a four-helix bundle where two α helices are separated by a turn; the DNA-binding motif, which forms a helix-turn-helix structure; and the POU-homeodomain, which is composed of three α helices, contained in the motif. This homeodomain is considered atypical due to an extended loop inserted between the second and third helices relative to the canonical homeodomain fold. The atypical insertion is thought to stabilize the interface to improve transcriptional efficiency. Meanwhile, the dimerization domain is responsible for the homo- and heterodimerization of HNF-1α. The resulting dimer contains a rigid "mini-zipper", comprising α-helices 1 and 1′, linked by a non-canonical tight turn to a flexible C-terminal comprising α-helices 2 and 2′.

== Function ==
HNF-1α is a transcription factor expressed in organs of endoderm origin, including liver, kidneys, pancreas, intestines, stomach, spleen, thymus, testis, and keratinocytes and melanocytes in human skin. It has been shown to affect intestinal epithelial cell growth and cell lineages differentiation. For instance, HNF1A is an important cell-intrinsic transcription factor in adult B lymphopoiesis. The participation of HNF-1α in glucose metabolism and diabetes has been reported, including the involvement in GLUT1 and GLUT2 transporter expression in pancreatic β-cells and angiotensin-converting enzyme 2 gene expression in pancreatic islets. HNF-1α could promote the transcription of several proteins involved in the management of type II diabetes including dipeptidyl peptidase-IV (DPP-IV/CD26). HNF-1α is also involved in various metabolic pathways of other organs, such as being a transcriptional regulator of bile acid transporters in the intestine and kidneys. HNF-1α is involved in the promotion of hepatic organic cation transporters, which uptake certain classes of pharmaceuticals; hence, the loss of its function can lead to drug metabolism problems. In addition, HNF-1α regulates the expression of acute phase proteins, such as fibrinogen, c-reactive protein, and interleukin 1 receptor, which are involved with inflammation. Moreover, significantly lower levels of HNF-1α in pancreatic tumors and hepatocellular adenomas than in normal adjacent tissues was observed, suggesting that HNF-1α might play a possible tumor suppressor role.

== Clinical significance ==
HNF1A mutations can cause maturity onset diabetes of the young type 3, one of the forms of "monogenic diabetes", as well as hepatocellular adenoma. HNF-1 protein is present in ovarian clear-cell carcinoma.

In humans, mutations in HNF1A cause diabetes that responds to low dose sulfonylurea agents. The identification of extreme sulfonylurea sensitivity in patients with diabetes mellitus owing to heterozygous mutations in HNF1A presents a clear example of the relevance of HNF1A in diabetes patients and how pharmacogenetics can contribute in patient care. For example, patients with maturity onset diabetes of the young owing to mutations in HNF1A (which accounts for ~3% of all diabetes mellitus cases diagnosed under the age of 30 years) are extremely sensitive to sulfonylurea treatment and can successfully transition off insulin treatment. Likewise, patients with diabetes caused by mutations in the HNF1A gene have been described as sensitive to the hypoglycemic effects of sulphonylureas. The cause of hyperglycemia appears to alter the response to hypoglycemic drugs. Accordingly, HNF-1α-induced diabetes has marked sulphonylurea sensitivity. This pharmacogenetic effect is consistent with models of HNF-1α deficiency, and the genetic basis of hyperglycemia may have implications for patient management. Common genetic variation within HNF1A is also associated with risk of developing type 2 diabetes and increased penetrance of early-onset diabetes

=== Clinical marker ===
A multi-locus genetic risk score study based on a combination of 27 loci, including the HNF1A gene, identified individuals at increased risk for both incident and recurrent coronary artery disease events, as well as an enhanced clinical benefit from statin therapy. The study was based on a community cohort study (the Malmo Diet and Cancer study) and four additional randomized controlled trials of primary prevention cohorts (JUPITER and ASCOT) and secondary prevention cohorts (CARE and PROVE IT-TIMI 22).

== Interactions ==
HNF1A has been shown to interact with:

- CREB-binding protein and
- EP300,
- PCAF,
- PCBD1,
- RAC3,
- Src,
- DCoH

== See also ==
- Hepatocyte nuclear factors
- Maturity onset diabetes of the young
- Other HNF class homeoboxes:
  - HNF1B
  - HMBOX1
