= MODY 3 =

- Other names: Maturity-Onset Diabetes of the Young, Type 3

MODY 3 or HNF1A-MODY is a form of maturity-onset diabetes of the young. It is caused by mutations of the HNF1-alpha gene, a homeobox gene on human chromosome 12. This is the most common type of MODY in populations with European ancestry, accounting for about 70% of all cases in Europe. HNF1α is a transcription factor (also known as transcription factor 1, TCF1) that is thought to control a regulatory network (including, among other genes, HNF1α) important for differentiation of beta cells. Mutations of this gene lead to reduced beta cell mass or impaired function. MODY 1 and MODY 3 diabetes are clinically similar. About 70% of people develop this type of diabetes by age 25 years, but it occurs at much later ages in a few. This type of diabetes can often be treated with sulfonylureas with excellent results for decades. However, the loss of insulin secretory capacity is slowly progressive and most eventually need insulin.

This is the form of MODY which can most resemble diabetes mellitus type 1, and one of the incentives for diagnosing it is that insulin may be discontinued or deferred in favor of oral sulfonylureas. Some people treated with insulin for years due to a presumption of type 1 diabetes have been able to switch to oral medication and discontinue injections. Long-term diabetic complications can occur if blood glucose levels are not adequately controlled.

High-sensitivity measurements of C-reactive protein may help to distinguish between HNF1A-MODY and other forms of diabetes
