= FOXA2 =

Mammalian protein found in Homo sapiens

Identifiers
- Aliases: FOXA2, HNF3B, TCF3B, forkhead box A2, HNF-3-beta
- External IDs: OMIM: 600288; MGI: 1347476; GeneCards: FOXA2

Gene location (Human)
Chr.	Chromosome 20 (human)
Band	20p11.21	Start	22,580,998 bp
Band	20p11.21	End	22,585,455 bp

Gene location (Mouse)
Chr.	Chromosome 2 (mouse)
Band	2 G3|2 73.38 cM	Start	147,884,797 bp
Band	2 G3|2 73.38 cM	End	147,888,889 bp
RNA expression pattern
Bgee	Human / Mouse (ortholog); Top expressed in: pancreatic ductal cell; pylorus; buccal mucosa cell; beta cell; right uterine tube; right lobe of liver; cardia; body of pancreas; lower lobe of lung; testicle / Top expressed in: endoderm; neural plate; epithelium of stomach; notochord; islet of Langerhans; embryonic organizer; Hindgut; mucous cell of stomach; pyloric antrum; floor plate; More reference expression data
BioGPS	n/a
Gene ontology
Molecular function	DNA binding; sequence-specific DNA binding; protein domain specific binding; DNA-binding transcription factor activity; transcription factor binding; RNA polymerase II cis-regulatory region sequence-specific DNA binding; DNA-binding transcription factor activity, RNA polymerase II-specific
Cellular component	cytoplasm; nucleoplasm; cell junction; nucleus
Biological process	dopaminergic neuron differentiation; regulation of insulin secretion involved in cellular response to glucose stimulus; regulation of transcription, DNA-templated; positive regulation of gastrulation; response to interleukin-6; positive regulation of transcription from RNA polymerase II promoter by glucose; regulation of transcription by RNA polymerase II; cell fate specification; adult locomotory behavior; negative regulation of DNA-binding transcription factor activity; transcription, DNA-templated; positive regulation of transcription, DNA-templated; multicellular organism development; negative regulation of glucokinase activity; negative regulation of detection of glucose; regulation of blood coagulation; positive regulation of embryonic development; primitive streak formation; negative regulation of epithelial to mesenchymal transition; endocrine pancreas development; positive regulation of transcription by RNA polymerase II; positive regulation of cell-cell adhesion mediated by cadherin; anatomical structure morphogenesis; chromatin organization; negative regulation of transcription from RNA polymerase II promoter by glucose; cell differentiation
Sources:Amigo / QuickGO
Orthologs
Databases	NCBI: entry; OMA: entry
Species	Human	Mouse
Entrez	3170	15376
Ensembl	ENSG00000125798	ENSMUSG00000037025
UniProt	Q9Y261	P35583
RefSeq (mRNA)	NM_021784; NM_153675	NM_001291065; NM_001291067; NM_010446
RefSeq (protein)	NP_068556; NP_710141	NP_001277994; NP_001277996; NP_034576
Location (UCSC)	Chr 20: 22.58 – 22.59 Mb	Chr 2: 147.88 – 147.89 Mb
PubMed search
- Wikidata
View/Edit Human	View/Edit Mouse

Forkhead box protein A2 (FOXA2), also known as hepatocyte nuclear factor 3-beta (HNF-3B), is a transcription factor that plays an important role during development, in mature tissues and, when dysregulated or mutated, also in cancer.

== Structure ==
FOXA2 belongs to a subfamily of the Forkhead box (FOX) transcription factors, the other members being FOXA1 and FOXA3. This subfamily of mammalian FOX proteins was first identified because of their ability to bind DNA in rat liver nuclear extracts. The proteins were therefore originally named hepatocyte nuclear factor 3 alpha, beta and gamma. These transcription factors contain a forkhead domain (also known as the winged-helix domain) flanked by sequences necessary for nuclear localization. Their N- and C-termini are also conserved and serve as transactivation domains.

== Functions ==
FOXA transcription factors have “pioneering” property, i.e. they can directly bind to condensed chromatin. This feature has been observed both in vitro and in vivo, where FOXA transcription factors can bind nucleosome-bound target DNA sequences. The pioneering property is conferred by the factors’ highly conserved DNA-binding domain, which is structurally similar to the linker histones H1 and H5 This feature enables FOXA2 to access closed chromatin and displace linker histones. In this way, FOXA2 promotes local chromatin opening, permits the recruitment of alternative histones and facilitates the subsequent binding of other transcription factors. Thus, FOXA2 have important roles in cell type specification by promoting chromatin accessibility for the binding of lineage- or tissue-specific factors The FOXA factors also facilitate the maintenance of cell identity by bookmarking cell type-specific genes so that these genes can be rapidly reactivated after cytokinesis. One example is that ectopic expression of FOXA2 together with HNF4A drives transdifferentiation of fibroblasts to hepatocyte-like cells.

Consistent with its role as a pioneering transcription factor, FOXA2 is expressed in early development and essential for the development and homeostasis of various cell types and tissues. In mice, Foxa2 expression emerges in the primitive streak and node at embryonic day (E) 6.5, and in the mesoderm and definitive endoderm at E7.5. Its expression is subsequently maintained in endoderm-derived tissues, including the pancreas, liver, prostate, thyroid and lung, throughout development and in mature tissues. In addition, Foxa2 is expressed in ectoderm-derived neural tissues. Foxa2 knockout is embryonically lethal to mice, which die between E10 and E11 and show defects in all three germ layers. Mice with heterozygosity for Foxa2 knockout are viable and exhibit a phenotype similar to Parkinson's disease upon aging. Conditional knockout studies show that Foxa2 is important for the formation of pancreatic islets and maturation of alpha and beta cells, thereby being essential for glucose homeostasis.

Dysregulation of FOXA transcription factors have been linked to several types of human cancers, including acute myeloid leukemia and cancer of the esophagus, lung, thyroid, pancreas, breast and prostate. Single nucleotide polymorphisms in the FOXA2 gene are associated with hepatocellular carcinoma, especially in males. This association has been replicated in mice and may depend on androgen receptor-mediated regulation
