= HMBOX1 =

Protein-coding gene in the species Homo sapiens

Identifiers
- Aliases: HMBOX1, HNF1LA, HOT1, PBHNF, homeobox containing 1, TAH1
- External IDs: MGI: 2445066; GeneCards: HMBOX1
Available structures
| PDB | Ortholog search: PDBe RCSB |
| PDB | List of PDB id codes 2CUF, 4J19 |

Gene location (Human)
| Chr. | Chromosome 8 (human) |
| Band | 8p21.1-p12 | Start | 28,890,395 bp |
| Band | 8p21.1-p12 | End | 29,064,764 bp |

Gene location (Mouse)
| Chr. | Chromosome 14 (mouse) |
| Band | 14|14 D1 | Start | 65,049,049 bp |
| Band | 14|14 D1 | End | 65,187,320 bp |
RNA expression pattern
| Bgee | Human / Mouse (ortholog); Top expressed in: epithelium of colon; spinal ganglia; right adrenal cortex; olfactory bulb; secondary oocyte; cardia; left adrenal cortex; pars reticulata; ventral tegmental area; trigeminal ganglion / Top expressed in: genital tubercle; neural layer of retina; superior frontal gyrus; ventricular zone; tail of embryo; Rostral migratory stream; dentate gyrus of hippocampal formation granule cell; gastrula; cerebellar cortex; lumbar spinal ganglion; More reference expression data |
| BioGPS | n/a |
Gene ontology
| Molecular function | DNA binding; telomerase activity; double-stranded telomeric DNA binding; protein binding; identical protein binding; telomeric DNA binding; DNA-binding transcription repressor activity, RNA polymerase II-specific; sequence-specific DNA binding; protein-containing complex binding; DNA-binding transcription factor activity, RNA polymerase II-specific |
| Cellular component | cytoplasm; nucleus; telomerase holoenzyme complex; nucleoplasm; cytosol; nuclear body; telomere; chromosome; Cajal body; PML body |
| Biological process | positive regulation of transcription, DNA-templated; positive regulation of telomere maintenance via telomerase; negative regulation of transcription, DNA-templated; regulation of transcription, DNA-templated; positive regulation of telomerase activity; transcription, DNA-templated; RNA-dependent DNA biosynthetic process; positive regulation of chromatin binding; negative regulation of transcription by RNA polymerase II; regulation of telomerase activity |
Sources:Amigo / QuickGO
Orthologs
| Databases | NCBI: entry; OMA: entry |
| Species | Human | Mouse |
| Entrez | 79618 | 219150 |
| Ensembl | ENSG00000147421 | ENSMUSG00000021972 |
| UniProt | Q6NT76 | Q8BJA3 |
| RefSeq (mRNA) | NM_001135726; NM_024567; NM_001324382; NM_001324383; NM_001324384 NM_001324385; NM_001324386; NM_001324387; NM_001324388; NM_001324389; NM_001324390; NM_001324391; NM_001324392; NM_001324393; NM_001324394; NM_001324395; NM_001330498 | NM_177338; NM_001347626; NM_001347627 |
| RefSeq (protein) | NP_001129198; NP_001311311; NP_001311312; NP_001311313; NP_001311314 NP_001311315; NP_001311316; NP_001311317; NP_001311318; NP_001311319; NP_001311320; NP_001311321; NP_001311322; NP_001311323; NP_001311324; NP_001317427; NP_078843 | NP_001334555; NP_001334556; NP_796312 |
| Location (UCSC) | Chr 8: 28.89 – 29.06 Mb | Chr 14: 65.05 – 65.19 Mb |
| PubMed search |
- Wikidata
| View/Edit Human | View/Edit Mouse |

Homeobox containing 1, also known as homeobox telomere-binding protein 1 (HOT1), is a protein that in humans is encoded by the HMBOX1 gene. HMBOX1 directly binds to the double-stranded repeat sequence of telomeres.

HMBOX1 has originally been identified to associate with telomeric chromatin in telomerase-positive cancer cells and cancer cells that maintain their telomeres based on the Alternative Lengthening of Telomeres (ALT) mechanism by the 'reverse ChIP' technique PICh (Proteomics of Isolated Chromatin segments). Subsequently, direct binding to telomeric DNA was demonstrated through a co-crystal structure of the DNA-binding domain of HMBOX1 with telomeric DNA. Loss-of-function and gain-of-function experiments classify HMBOX1 as a positive regulator of telomere length. HMBOX1 had originally been described as a transcriptional repressor based on reporter gene assays, but genome-wide approaches using RNA-seq and ChIP-seq see little to no such effect at least in several cancer cell lines.
