= FOXA3 =

Protein-coding gene in the species Homo sapiens

Identifiers
- Aliases: FOXA3, FKHH3, HNF3G, TCF3G, forkhead box A3
- External IDs: OMIM: 602295; MGI: 1347477; GeneCards: FOXA3
Available structures
PDB	Ortholog search: PDBe RCSB
PDB	List of PDB id codes 1VTN

Gene location (Human)
Chr.	Chromosome 19 (human)
Band	19q13.32	Start	45,863,989 bp
Band	19q13.32	End	45,873,797 bp

Gene location (Mouse)
Chr.	Chromosome 7 (mouse)
Band	7 A3|7 9.46 cM	Start	18,747,209 bp
Band	7 A3|7 9.46 cM	End	18,757,463 bp
RNA expression pattern
Bgee	Human / Mouse (ortholog); Top expressed in: mucosa of ileum; right lobe of liver; pancreatic ductal cell; mucosa of transverse colon; body of pancreas; mucosa of sigmoid colon; rectum; cartilage tissue; islet of Langerhans; palpebral conjunctiva / Top expressed in: mucous cell of stomach; crypt of lieberkuhn of small intestine; epithelium of stomach; pyloric antrum; liver; left lobe of liver; large intestine; left colon; yolk sac; Hindgut; More reference expression data
BioGPS	n/a
Gene ontology
Molecular function	DNA-binding transcription factor activity; sequence-specific DNA binding; DNA binding; transcription factor binding; protein domain specific binding; DNA-binding transcription factor activity, RNA polymerase II-specific
Cellular component	nucleoplasm; actin cytoskeleton; nucleus
Biological process	cellular glucose homeostasis; regulation of transcription by RNA polymerase II; cellular response to starvation; multicellular organism development; regulation of transcription, DNA-templated; transcription, DNA-templated; spermatogenesis; positive regulation of transcription by RNA polymerase II; anatomical structure morphogenesis; cell differentiation; chromatin organization
Sources:Amigo / QuickGO
Orthologs
Databases	NCBI: entry; OMA: entry
Species	Human	Mouse
Entrez	3171	15377
Ensembl	ENSG00000170608	ENSMUSG00000040891
UniProt	P55318	P35584
RefSeq (mRNA)	NM_004497	NM_008260
RefSeq (protein)	NP_004488	NP_032286
Location (UCSC)	Chr 19: 45.86 – 45.87 Mb	Chr 7: 18.75 – 18.76 Mb
PubMed search
- Wikidata
View/Edit Human	View/Edit Mouse

Hepatocyte nuclear factor 3-gamma (HNF-3G), also known as forkhead box protein A3 (FOXA3) or transcription factor 3G (TCF-3G) is a protein that in humans is encoded by the FOXA3 gene.

== Function ==
HNF-3G is a member of the forkhead class of DNA-binding proteins. These hepatocyte nuclear factors are transcriptional activators for liver-specific transcripts such as albumin and transthyretin, and they also interact with chromatin. Similar family members in mice have roles in the regulation of metabolism and in the differentiation of the pancreas and liver.
