= HNF1B =

Mammalian protein found in Homo sapiens

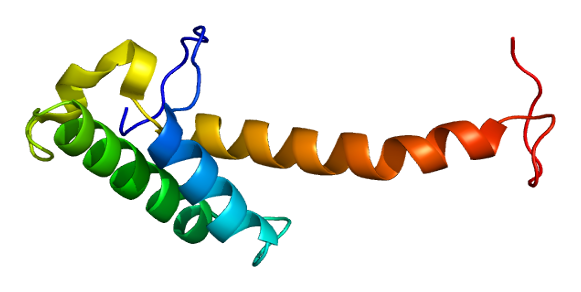

Identifiers
- Aliases: HNF1B, FJHN, HNF-1B, HNF1beta, HNF2, HPC11, LF-B3, LFB3, MODY5, TCF-2, TCF2, VHNF1, HNF-1-beta, HNF1 homeobox B, T2D, ADTKD3, RCAD
- External IDs: OMIM: 189907; MGI: 98505; GeneCards: HNF1B
Available structures
PDB	Ortholog search: PDBe RCSB
PDB	List of PDB id codes 2DA6, 2H8R

Gene location (Human)
Chr.	Chromosome 17 (human)
Band	17q12	Start	37,686,431 bp
Band	17q12	End	37,745,059 bp

Gene location (Mouse)
Chr.	Chromosome 11 (mouse)
Band	11 C|11 51.23 cM	Start	83,740,889 bp
Band	11 C|11 51.23 cM	End	83,796,645 bp
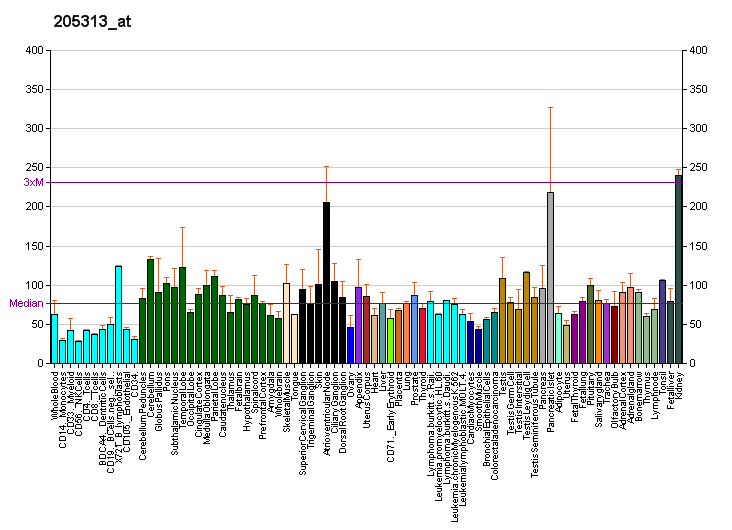
RNA expression pattern
Bgee	Human / Mouse (ortholog); Top expressed in: body of pancreas; gallbladder; human kidney; mucosa of transverse colon; islet of Langerhans; right uterine tube; duodenum; right lobe of liver; rectum; testicle / Top expressed in: right kidney; proximal tubule; human kidney; connecting tubule; yolk sac; efferent ductule; left colon; Bowman's capsule; transitional epithelium of urinary bladder; medullary collecting duct; More reference expression data
BioGPS	More reference expression data
Gene ontology
Molecular function	DNA binding; sequence-specific DNA binding; protein homodimerization activity; DNA-binding transcription factor activity; protein binding; protein heterodimerization activity; transcription factor activity, RNA polymerase II distal enhancer sequence-specific binding; RNA polymerase II transcription regulatory region sequence-specific DNA binding; cis-regulatory region sequence-specific DNA binding; DNA-binding transcription factor activity, RNA polymerase II-specific; protein-containing complex binding
Cellular component	transcription regulator complex; nucleoplasm; nucleus
Biological process	Notch signaling pathway; pronephros development; mesonephric tubule development; endoderm development; regulation of transcription, DNA-templated; response to organic cyclic compound; mesonephric duct development; endodermal cell fate specification; kidney development; mesonephric duct formation; ureteric bud elongation; protein-DNA complex assembly; negative regulation of mesenchymal cell apoptotic process involved in mesonephric nephron morphogenesis; hindbrain development; hepatocyte differentiation; epithelial cell proliferation; insulin secretion; negative regulation of apoptotic process; negative regulation of transcription by RNA polymerase II; response to glucose; positive regulation of transcription initiation from RNA polymerase II promoter; nephric duct formation; circadian regulation of gene expression; transcription, DNA-templated; regulation of branch elongation involved in ureteric bud branching; negative regulation of mesenchymal cell apoptotic process involved in metanephros development; epithelium development; nephric duct development; genitalia development; pronephric nephron tubule development; positive regulation of transcription, DNA-templated; hepatoblast differentiation; regulation of Wnt signaling pathway; positive regulation of gene expression; inner cell mass cell differentiation; embryonic morphogenesis; kidney morphogenesis; embryonic digestive tract morphogenesis; liver development; regulation of endodermal cell fate specification; branching morphogenesis of an epithelial tube; response to carbohydrate; regulation of pronephros size; anterior/posterior pattern specification; positive regulation of transcription by RNA polymerase II; endocrine pancreas development; regulation of transcription by RNA polymerase II; pancreas development
Sources:Amigo / QuickGO
Orthologs
Databases	NCBI: entry; OMA: entry
Species	Human	Mouse
Entrez	6928	21410
Ensembl	ENSG00000276194; ENSG00000275410	ENSMUSG00000020679
UniProt	P35680	P27889
RefSeq (mRNA)	NM_000458; NM_001165923; NM_001304286; NM_006481	NM_001291268; NM_001291269; NM_009330
RefSeq (protein)	NP_000449; NP_001159395; NP_001291215; NP_001159395.1	NP_001278197; NP_001278198; NP_033356
Location (UCSC)	Chr 17: 37.69 – 37.75 Mb	Chr 11: 83.74 – 83.8 Mb
PubMed search
- Wikidata
View/Edit Human	View/Edit Mouse

HNF1 homeobox B (hepatocyte nuclear factor 1 homeobox B), also known as HNF1B or transcription factor 2 (TCF2), is a human gene.

== Function ==
HNF1B encodes hepatocyte nuclear factor 1-beta, a protein of the homeobox-containing basic helix-turn-helix family. The HNF1B protein is believed to form heterodimers with another member of this transcription factor family, HNF1A; depending on the HNF1B isoform, the result may be to activate or inhibit transcription of target genes. Deficiency of HNF1B cause abnormal maternal-Zygote transition and early embryogenesis failure. Mutation of HNF1B that disrupts normal function has been identified as the cause of MODY 5 (Maturity-Onset of Diabetes, Type 5). A third human transcript variant is believed to exist based on such a variant in the rat: however, to date such an mRNA species has not been isolated.

== See also ==
- Hepatocyte nuclear factors
