= Renal cysts and diabetes syndrome =

- Other names: MODY 5
- MODY 5 is inherited in an autosomal dominant manner.

Renal cysts and diabetes syndrome (RCAD), also known as MODY 5 or HNF1B-MODY, is a form of maturity onset diabetes of the young.

== Presentation ==
HNF1β-related MODY is one of the less common forms of MODY, with some distinctive clinical features, including atrophy of the pancreas and several forms of renal disease. HNF1β, also known as transcription factor 2 (TCF2), is involved in early stages of embryonic development of several organs, including the pancreas, where it contributes to differentiation of pancreatic endocrine Ngn3^{+} cell progenitors from non-endocrine embryonic duct cells. The gene is on chromosome 17q.

The degree of insulin deficiency is variable. Diabetes can develop from infancy through middle adult life, and some family members who carry the gene remain free of diabetes into later adult life. Most of those who develop diabetes show atrophy of the entire pancreas, with mild or subclinical deficiency of exocrine as well as endocrine function.

The non-pancreatic manifestations are even more variable. Kidney and genitourinary malformation and diseases may occur, but inconsistently even within a family, and the specific conditions include a range of apparently unrelated anomalies and processes. The most common genitourinary condition is cystic kidney disease, but there are many varieties even of this. Renal effects begin with structural alterations (small kidneys, renal cysts, anomalies of the renal pelvis and calices), but a significant number develop slowly progressive chronic kidney failure associated with chronic cystic disease of the kidneys. In some cases, renal cysts may be detected in utero. Kidney disease may develop before or after hyperglycemia, and a significant number of people with MODY5 are discovered in renal clinics.

With or without kidney disease, some people with forms of HNF1β have had various minor or major anomalies of the reproductive system. Male defects have included epididymal cysts, agenesis of the vas deferens, or infertility due to abnormal spermatozoa. Affected women have been found to have vaginal agenesis, hypoplastic, or bicornuate uterus.

Liver enzyme elevations are common, but clinically significant liver disease is not. Hyperuricaemia and early onset gout have occurred.

== Causes ==
Renal cysts and diabetes syndrome is caused by mutations in or deletions of the HNF1B gene. These can be intragenic HNF1B mutations or affect other genes as well, such as in 17q12 microdeletion syndrome.

== Diagnosis ==
Genetic testing for mutations on the HNF1B gene can indicate MODY 5. The presence of familial and individual renal problems as well as diabetes mellitus with absence of type 1 and LADA antibodies in young individuals with a healthy lifestyle can lead to testing.

== Management ==
Treatment is dependent on the phenotype. Hyperglycaemia can be treated with insulin, oral medication or, according to newest data, with GLP-1 analogs. Sulfonylurea has been described as ineffective. Pancreatic exocrine insufficiency is treated with pancreatic enzymes such as Creon. Some patients take magnesium supplementation or intravenous infusions. Patients with both kidney failure and diabetes can request a simultaneous pancreas and kidney transplant.
