= ZHX =

ZHX may refer to:

- Zinc fingers and homeoboxes, a gene family consisting of:
  - ZHX1
  - ZHX2
  - ZHX3
- zhx, ISO 639-5 code for varieties of Chinese
