= Pioneer factor =

Transcription factor

Pioneer factors are transcription factors that can directly bind condensed chromatin. They can have positive and negative effects on transcription and are important in recruiting other transcription factors and histone modification enzymes as well as controlling DNA methylation. They were first discovered in 2002 as factors capable of binding to target sites on nucleosomal DNA in compacted chromatin and endowing competency for gene activity during hepatogenesis. Pioneer factors are involved in initiating cell differentiation and activation of cell-specific genes. This property is observed in histone fold-domain containing transcription factors (fork head box (FOX) and NF-Y) and other transcription factors that use zinc finger(s) for DNA binding (Groucho TLE, Gal4, and GATA).

The eukaryotic cell condenses its genome into tightly packed chromatin and nucleosomes. This ability saves space in the nucleus for only actively transcribed genes and hides unnecessary or detrimental genes from being transcribed. Access to these condensed regions is done by chromatin remodelling by either balancing histone modifications or directly with pioneer factors that can loosen the chromatin themselves or as a flag recruiting other factors. Pioneer factors are not necessarily required for assembly of the transcription apparatus and may dissociate after being replaced by other factors.

== Active rearrangement ==
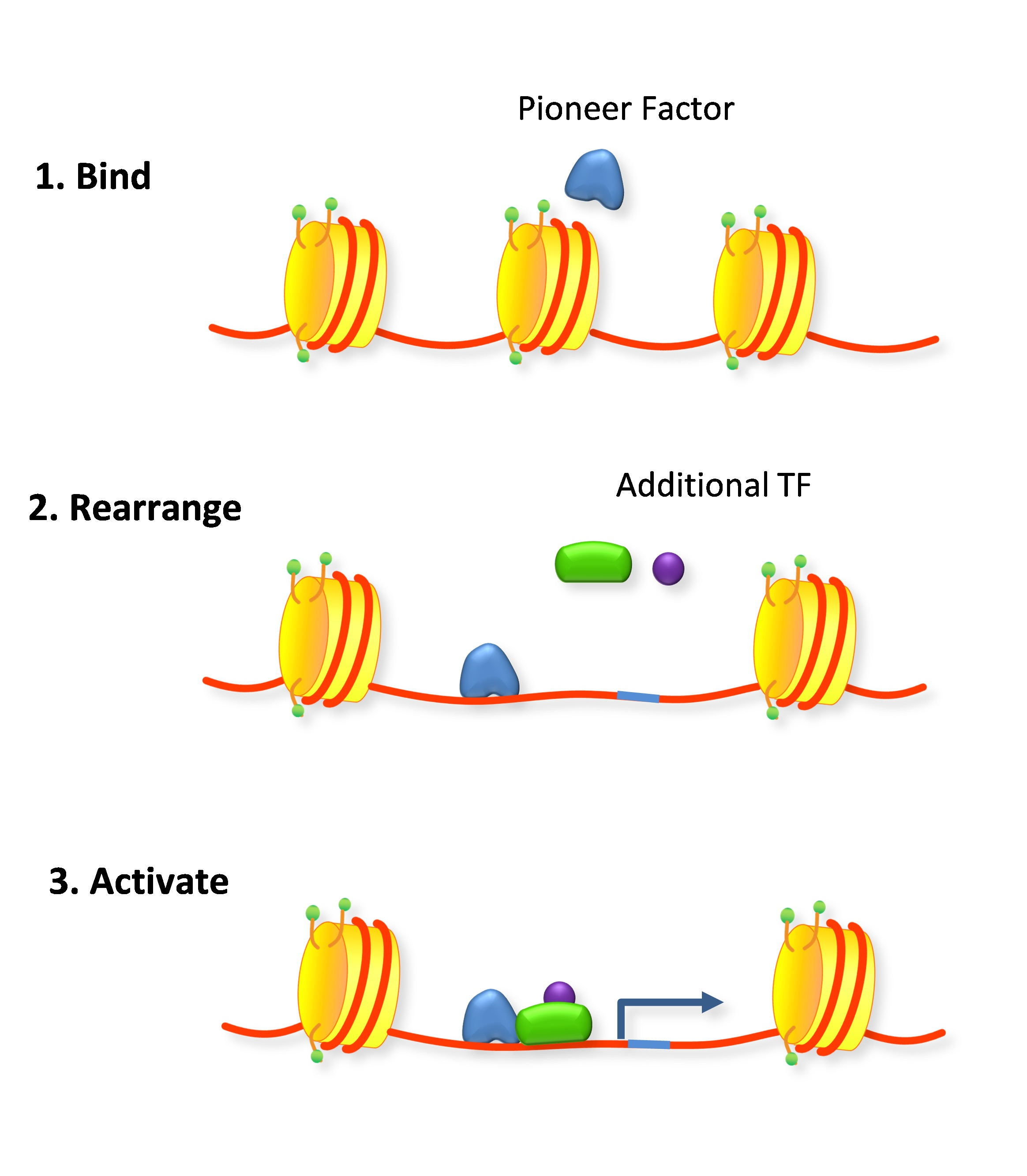
Opening of condensed chromatin by a pioneer factor to initiate transcription. The pioneer factor binds to tightly packed chromatin and causes a nucleosomal rearrangement. This new configuration allows space for other transcription factors to bind and initiate transcription.

Pioneer factors can also actively affect transcription by directly opening up condensed chromatin in an ATP-independent process. This is a common trait of fork head box factors (which contain a winged helix DNA-binding domain that mimics the DNA-binding domain of the linker H1 histone), and NF-Y (whose NF-YB and NF-YC subunits contain histone-fold domains similar to those of the core histones H2A/H2B).

=== Fork head box factors ===
The similarity to histone H1 explains how fork head factors are able to bind chromatin by interacting with the major groove of only the one available side of DNA wrapped around a nucleosome. Fork head domains also have a helix that confers sequence specificity unlike linker histone. The C terminus is associated with higher mobility around the nucleosome than linker histone, displacing it and rearranging nucleosomal landscapes effectively. This active re-arrangement of the nucleosomes allows for other transcription factors to bind the available DNA. In thyroid cell differentiation FoxE binds to compacted chromatin of the thyroid peroxidase promoter and opens it for NF1 binding.

=== NF-Y ===
NF-Y is a heterotrimeric complex composed of NF-YA, NF-YB, and NF-YC subunits. The key structural feature of the NF-Y/DNA complex is the minor-groove interaction of its DNA binding domain-containing subunit NF-YA, which induces an ~80° bend in the DNA. NF-YB and NF-YC interact with DNA through non-specific histone-fold domain-DNA contacts. NF-YA's unique DNA-binding mode and NF-YB/NF-YC's nucleosome-like properties of non-specific DNA binding impose sufficient spatial constraints to induce flanking nucleosomes to slide outward, making nearby recognition sites for other transcription factors accessible.

== Passive factors ==
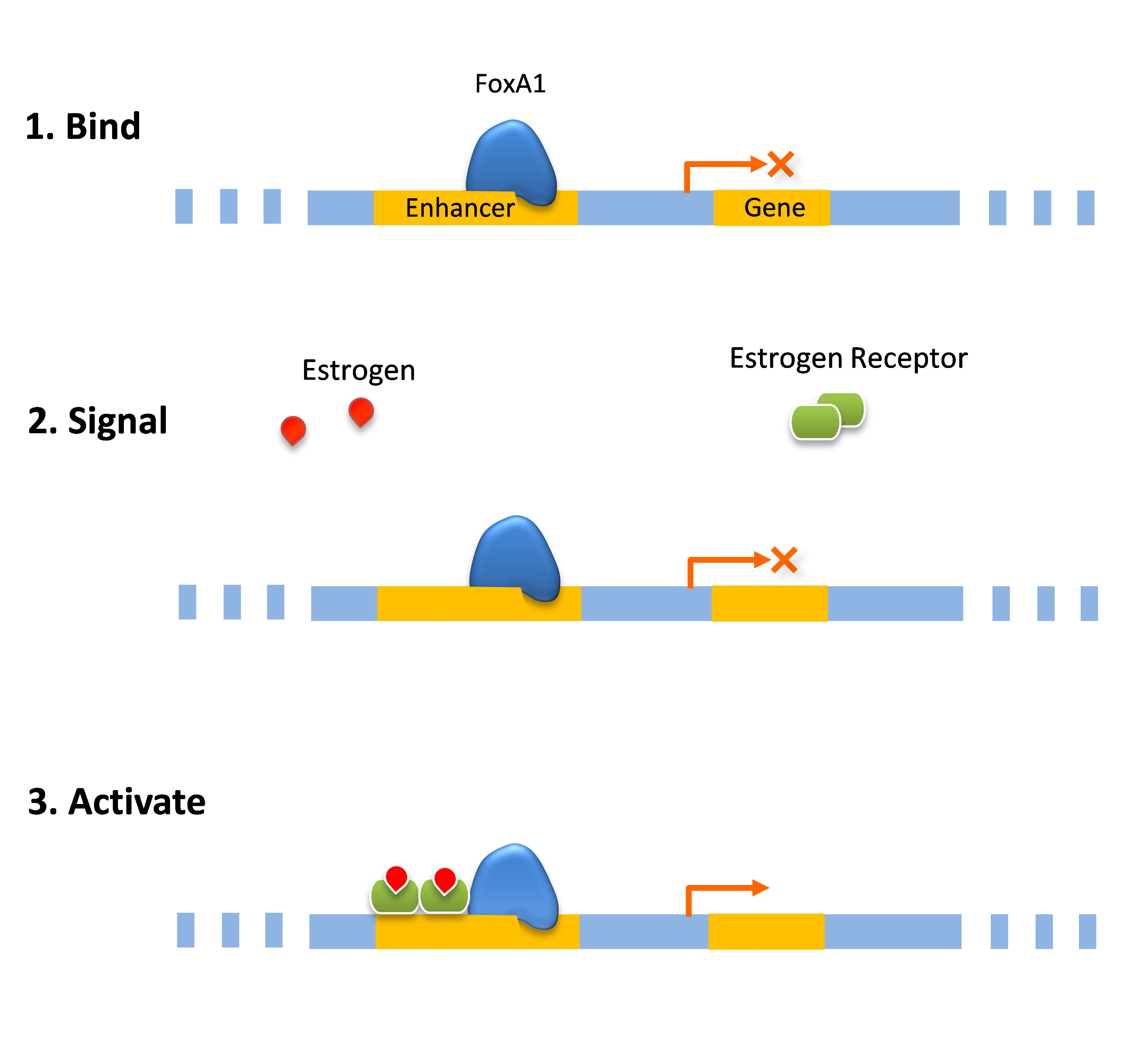
An example of the cell ‘priming’ for rapidly induced transcription. The pioneer factor, FoxA1 binds the enhancer in the first step but can not initiate transcription. Next when the signal, estrogen, is present the estrogen receptor can quickly find the ‘bookmark’ pioneer factor. When the estrogen receptor is bound transcription is initiated.

Pioneer factors can function passively, by acting as a bookmark for the cell to recruit other transcription factors to specific genes in condensed chromatin. This can be important for priming the cell for a rapid response as the enhancer is already bound by a pioneer transcription factor giving it a head start towards assembling the transcription preinitiation complex. Hormone responses are often quickly induced in the cell using this priming method such as with the estrogen receptor. Another form of priming is when an enhancer is simultaneously bound by activating and repressing pioneer factors. This balance can be tipped by dissociation of one of the factors. In hepatic cell differentiation the activating pioneer factor FOXA1 recruits a repressor, grg3, that prevents transcription until the repressor is down-regulated later on in the differentiation process.
In a direct role pioneer factors can bind an enhancer and recruit activation complex that will modify the chromatin directly. The change in the chromatin changes the affinity, decreasing the affinity of the pioneer factor such that it is replaced by a transcription factor that has a higher affinity. This is a mechanism for the cell to switch a gene on was observed with glucocorticoid receptor recruiting modification factors that then modify the site to bind activated estrogen receptor which was coined as a “bait and switch” mechanism.

== Epigenetic effects ==
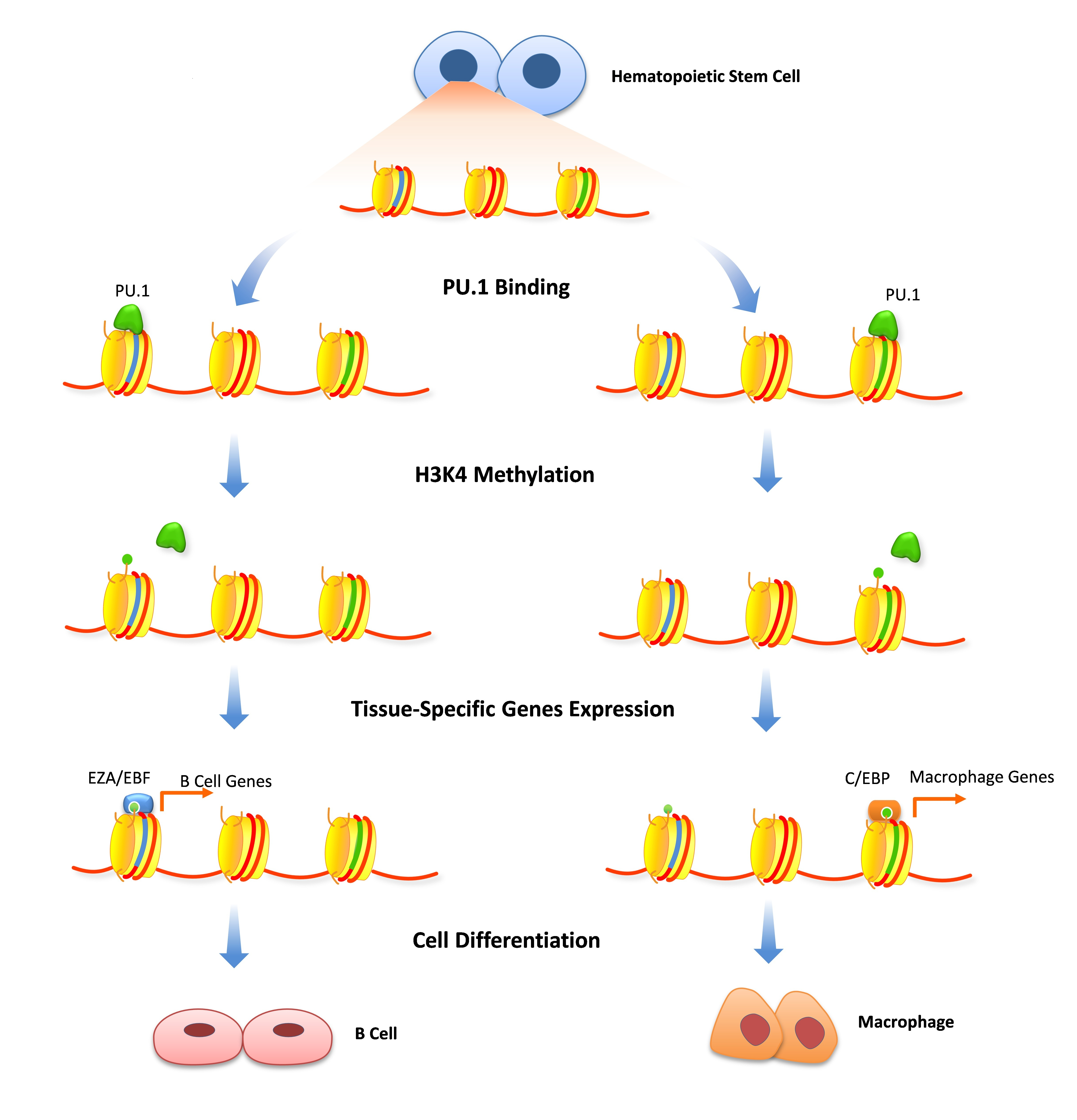
Pioneer factor, PU.1, binding cell-specific gene regulation in hematopoietic differentiation. In hematopoietic stem cells PU.1 binds different lineage-specific enhancers and recruits histone modification enzymes that mark these enhancers with H3K4me1. These modified histones are then recognized by cell-specific transcription factors that activate genes leading to the differentiation of B-cells or macrophages.

Pioneer factors can exhibit their greatest range of effects on transcription through the modulation of epigenetic factors by recruiting activating or repressing histone modification enzymes and controlling CpG methylation by protecting specific cysteine residues. This has effects on controlling the timing of transcription during cell differentiation processes.

=== Histone modification ===
Histone modification is a well-studied mechanism to transiently adjust chromatin density. Pioneer factors can play a role in this by binding specific enhancers and flagging histone modification enzymes to that specific gene. Repressive pioneer factors can inhibit transcription by recruiting factors that modify histones that further tighten the chromatin. This is important to limit gene expression to specific cell types and has to be removed only when cell differentiation begins. FoxD3 has been associated as a repressor of both B-cell and melanocytic cell differentiation pathways, maintaining repressive histone modifications where bound, that have to be overcome to start differentiation. Pioneer factors can also be associated with recruiting transcription-activating histone modifications. Enzymes that modify H3K4 with mono and di-methylation are associated with increasing transcription and have been shown to bind pioneer factors. In B cell differentiation PU.1 is necessary to signal specific histones for activating H3K4me1 modifications that differentiate hematopoietic stem cells into either the B-cell or macrophage lineage. FoxA1 binding induces HSK4me2 during neuronal differentiation of pluripotent stem cells as well as the loss of DNA methylation. SOX9 recruits histone modification enzymes MLL3 and MLL4 to deposit H3K4me1 prior to the opening of enhancers in developing hair follicle and basal cell carcinoma.

=== DNA methylation ===
Pioneer factors can also affect transcription and differentiation through the control of DNA methylation. Pioneer factors that bind to CpG islands and cytosine residues block access to methyltransferases. Many eukaryotic cells have CpG islands in their promoters that can be modified by methylation having adverse effects on their ability to control transcription. This phenomenon is also present in promoters without CpG islands where single cytosine residues are protected from methylation until further cell differentiation. An example is FoxD3 preventing methylation of a cytosine residue in Alb1 enhancer, acting as a place holder for FoxA1 later in hepatic as well as in CpG islands of genes in chronic lymphocytic leukemia. For stable control of methylation state the cytosine residues are covered during mitosis, unlike most other transcription factors, to prevent methylation. Studies have shown that during mitosis 15% of all interphase FoxA1 binding sites were bound. The protection of cytosine methylation can be quickly removed allowing for rapid induction when a signal is present.

=== Other pioneer factors ===
A well studied pioneer factor family is the Groucho-related (Gro/TLE/Grg) transcription factors that often have a negative effect on transcription. These chromatin binding domains can span up to 3-4 nucleosomes. These large domains are scaffolds for further protein interactions and also modify the chromatin for other pioneer factors such as FoxA1 which has been shown to bind to Grg3. Transcription factors with zinc finger DNA binding domains, such as the GATA family and glucocorticoid receptor. The zinc finger domains do not appear to bind nucleosomes well and can be displaced by FOX factors.

In the skin epidermis, SOX family transcription factor, SOX9, also behaves as a pioneer factor that governs hair follicle cell fate and can reprogram epidermal stem cells to a hair follicle fate.

== Role in cancer ==
The ability of pioneer factors to respond to extracellular signals to differentiate cell type has been studied as a potential component of hormone-dependent cancers. Hormones such as estrogen and IGFI are shown to increase pioneer factor concentration leading to a change in transcription. Known pioneer factors such as FoxA1, PBX1, TLE, AP2ɣ, GATA factors 2/3/4, and PU.1 have been associated with hormone-dependent cancer . FoxA1 is necessary for estrogen and androgen mediated hepatocarcinogenesis and is a defining gene for ER^{+} luminal breast cancer, as is another pioneer factor GATA3. FOXA1 particularly is expressed in 90% of breast cancer metastases and 89% of metastatic prostate cancers. In the breast cancer cell line, MCF-7, it was found that FoxA1 was bound to 50% of estrogen receptor binding sites independent of estrogen presence. High expression of pioneer factors is associated with poor prognosis with the exception of breast cancer where FoxA1 is associated with a stronger outcome.
The correlation between pioneer factors and cancer has led to prospective therapeutic targeting. In knockdown studies in the MCF-7 breast cancer cell line it was found that decreasing pioneer factors FoxA1 and AP2ɣ decreased ER signalling. Other fork head proteins have been associated with cancer, including FoxO3 and FoxM that repress the cell survival pathways Ras and PPI3K/AKT/IKK. Drugs such as Paclitaxel, Imatinib, and doxorubicin which activate FoxO3a or its targets are being used. Modification to modulate related factors with pioneer activity is a topic of interest in the early stages as knocking down pioneer factors may have toxic effects through alteration of the lineage pathways of healthy cells.
