= TLE4 =

Protein-coding gene in the species Homo sapiens

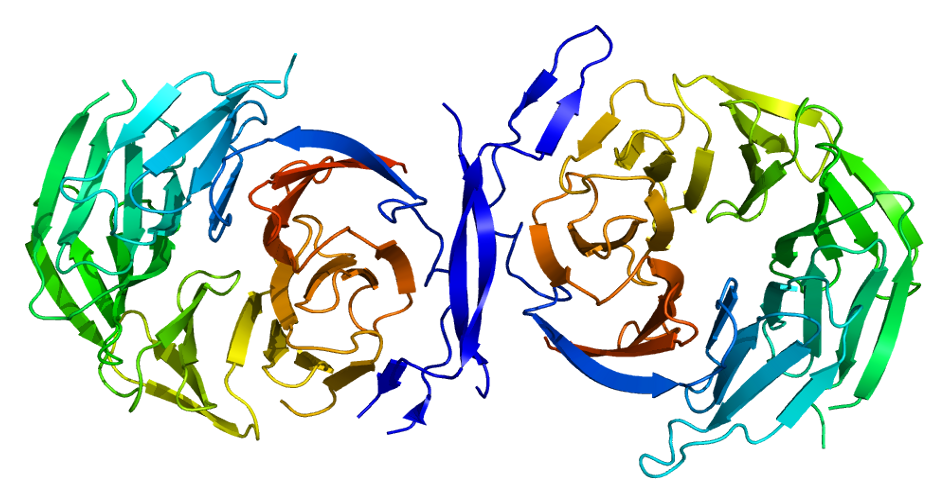

Identifiers
- Aliases: TLE4, BCE-1, BCE1, E(spI), ESG, ESG4, GRG4, Grg-4, transducin like enhancer of split 4, TLE family member 4, transcriptional corepressor, E(spl)
- External IDs: OMIM: 605132; MGI: 104633; GeneCards: TLE4

Gene location (Human)
Chr.	Chromosome 9 (human)
Band	9q21.31	Start	79,571,773 bp
Band	9q21.31	End	79,726,882 bp

Gene location (Mouse)
Chr.	Chromosome 19 (mouse)
Band	19 A|19 9.11 cM	Start	14,425,514 bp
Band	19 A|19 9.11 cM	End	14,575,415 bp
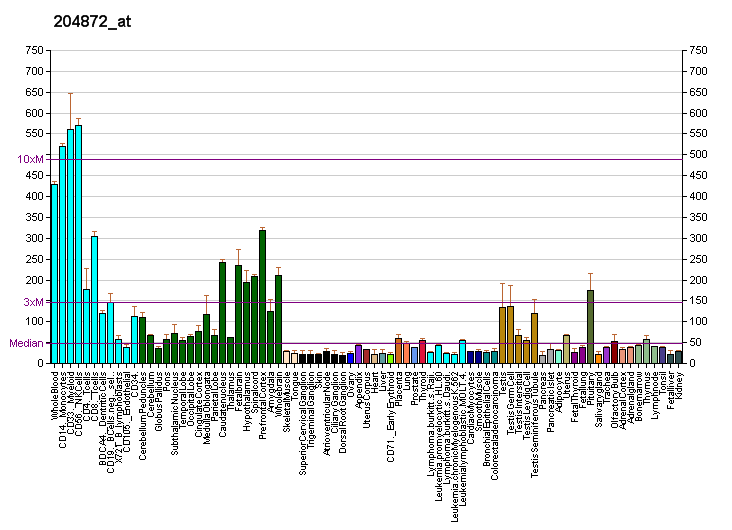

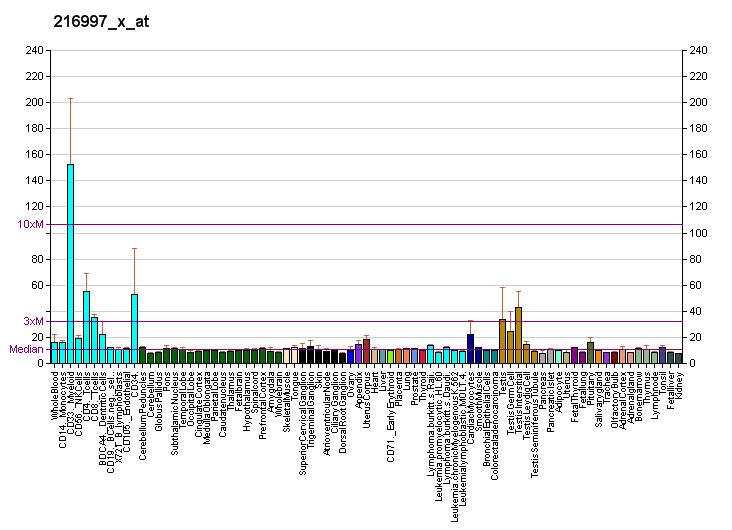
RNA expression pattern
Bgee	Human / Mouse (ortholog); Top expressed in: optic nerve; left testis; right testis; endothelial cell; corpus callosum; inferior olivary nucleus; inferior ganglion of vagus nerve; dorsal motor nucleus of vagus nerve; Region I of hippocampus proper; bone marrow cell / Top expressed in: renal corpuscle; medullary collecting duct; vestibular membrane of cochlear duct; superior cervical ganglion; suprachiasmatic nucleus; conjunctival fornix; nucleus accumbens; retinal pigment epithelium; tail of embryo; olfactory tubercle; More reference expression data
BioGPS	More reference expression data
Gene ontology
Molecular function	transcription factor activity, RNA polymerase II distal enhancer sequence-specific binding; chromatin binding; protein binding; transcription corepressor activity; DNA-binding transcription factor activity, RNA polymerase II-specific; molecular function
Cellular component	nucleus; nucleoplasm; transcription regulator complex; beta-catenin-TCF complex
Biological process	negative regulation of transcription, DNA-templated; regulation of transcription, DNA-templated; negative regulation of transcription by RNA polymerase II; Wnt signaling pathway; transcription, DNA-templated; beta-catenin-TCF complex assembly; cellular response to leukemia inhibitory factor; biological process; negative regulation of canonical Wnt signaling pathway
Sources:Amigo / QuickGO
Orthologs
Databases	NCBI: entry; OMA: entry
Species	Human	Mouse
Entrez	7091	21888
Ensembl	ENSG00000106829	ENSMUSG00000024642
UniProt	Q04727	Q62441
RefSeq (mRNA)	NM_001282748; NM_001282749; NM_001282753; NM_001282760; NM_007005 NM_001351541; NM_001351542; NM_001351543; NM_001351546; NM_001351547; NM_001351550; NM_001351552; NM_001351558; NM_001351560; NM_001351562; NM_001351563; NM_001351564; NM_001351556	NM_011600; NM_001302947; NM_001302950; NM_001302951
RefSeq (protein)	NP_001269677; NP_001269678; NP_001269682; NP_001269689; NP_008936 NP_001338470; NP_001338471; NP_001338472; NP_001338475; NP_001338476; NP_001338479; NP_001338481; NP_001338487; NP_001338489; NP_001338491; NP_001338492; NP_001338493; NP_001338485	NP_001289876; NP_001289879; NP_001289880; NP_035730
Location (UCSC)	Chr 9: 79.57 – 79.73 Mb	Chr 19: 14.43 – 14.58 Mb
PubMed search
- Wikidata
View/Edit Human	View/Edit Mouse

Transducin-like enhancer protein 4 is a protein that in humans is encoded by the TLE4 gene.

== Interactions ==
TLE4 has been shown to interact with PAX5.
