= ZHX2 =

Protein-coding gene in the species Homo sapiens

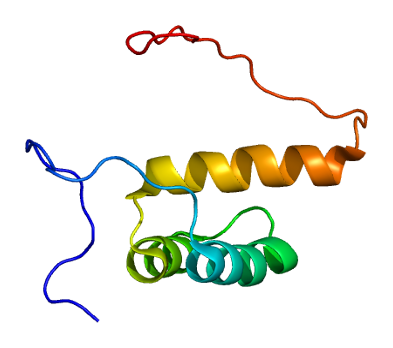

Identifiers
- Aliases: ZHX2, AFR1, RAF, zinc fingers and homeoboxes 2
- External IDs: OMIM: 609185; MGI: 2683087; GeneCards: ZHX2
Available structures
PDB	Ortholog search: PDBe RCSB
PDB	List of PDB id codes 2DMP, 3NAU

Gene location (Human)
Chr.	Chromosome 8 (human)
Band	8q24.13	Start	122,781,655 bp
Band	8q24.13	End	122,974,510 bp

Gene location (Mouse)
Chr.	Chromosome 15 (mouse)
Band	15 D1|15 24.01 cM	Start	57,558,061 bp
Band	15 D1|15 24.01 cM	End	57,703,228 bp
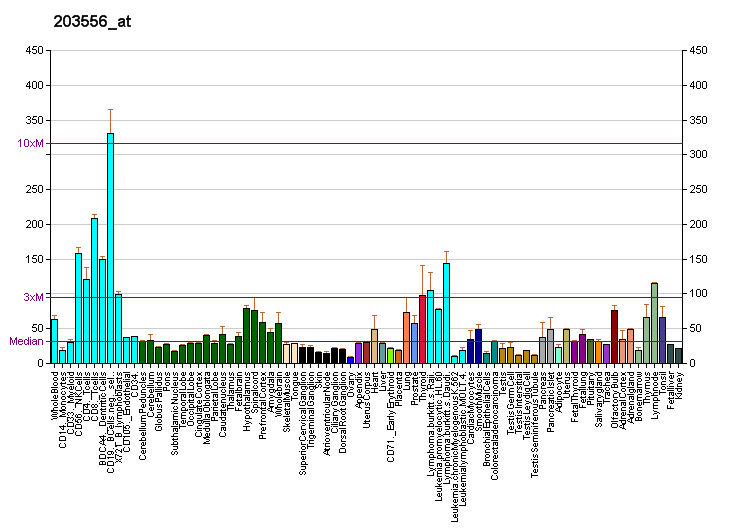
RNA expression pattern
Bgee	Human / Mouse (ortholog); Top expressed in: superficial temporal artery; dorsal motor nucleus of vagus nerve; saphenous vein; Skeletal muscle tissue of rectus abdominis; inferior olivary nucleus; internal globus pallidus; Skeletal muscle tissue of biceps brachii; right ventricle; caput epididymis; lactiferous duct / Top expressed in: knee joint; triceps brachii muscle; vastus lateralis muscle; otolith organ; temporal muscle; utricle; skeletal muscle tissue; medial head of gastrocnemius muscle; granulocyte; sternocleidomastoid muscle; More reference expression data
BioGPS	More reference expression data
Gene ontology
Molecular function	DNA-binding transcription factor activity; DNA binding; protein binding; protein homodimerization activity; transcription corepressor activity; metal ion binding; identical protein binding; protein heterodimerization activity; nucleic acid binding; DNA-binding transcription factor activity, RNA polymerase II-specific
Cellular component	nucleus; nucleoplasm; cytosol; plasma membrane
Biological process	regulation of transcription by RNA polymerase II; negative regulation of transcription, DNA-templated; regulation of transcription, DNA-templated; negative regulation of transcription by RNA polymerase II; mRNA catabolic process; negative regulation of neuron differentiation; somatic stem cell population maintenance; transcription, DNA-templated; retinal bipolar neuron differentiation; nervous system development; cell differentiation
Sources:Amigo / QuickGO
Orthologs
Databases	NCBI: entry; OMA: entry
Species	Human	Mouse
Entrez	22882	387609
Ensembl	ENSG00000178764	ENSMUSG00000071757
UniProt	Q9Y6X8	Q8C0C0
RefSeq (mRNA)	NM_014943; NM_001362797	NM_199449
RefSeq (protein)	NP_055758; NP_001349726	NP_955520
Location (UCSC)	Chr 8: 122.78 – 122.97 Mb	Chr 15: 57.56 – 57.7 Mb
PubMed search
- Wikidata
View/Edit Human	View/Edit Mouse

Zinc fingers and homeoboxes protein 2 is a protein that in humans is encoded by the ZHX2 gene.

The members of the zinc fingers and homeoboxes gene family are nuclear homodimeric transcriptional repressors that interact with the A subunit of nuclear factor-Y (NF-YA) and contain two C2H2-type zinc fingers and five homeobox DNA-binding domains. This gene encodes member 2 of this gene family. In addition to forming homodimers, this protein heterodimerizes with member 1 of the zinc fingers and homeoboxes family.

== See also ==
- Chromosome 8 (human)
- NFYA
- Protein dimer
