= FOXA1 =

Protein found in humans

Identifiers
- Aliases: FOXA1, HNF3A, TCF3A, forkhead box A1
- External IDs: OMIM: 602294; MGI: 1347472; GeneCards: FOXA1

Gene location (Human)
Chr.	Chromosome 14 (human)
Band	14q21.1	Start	37,589,552 bp
Band	14q21.1	End	37,596,059 bp

Gene location (Mouse)
Chr.	Chromosome 12 (mouse)
Band	12 C1|12 24.7 cM	Start	57,587,414 bp
Band	12 C1|12 24.7 cM	End	57,593,702 bp
RNA expression pattern
Bgee	Human / Mouse (ortholog); Top expressed in: olfactory zone of nasal mucosa; epithelium of bronchus; bronchial epithelial cell; right lobe of liver; prostate; rectum; nasal epithelium; mucosa of transverse colon; mucosa of paranasal sinus; body of stomach / Top expressed in: mucosa of urinary bladder; transitional epithelium of urinary bladder; epithelium of stomach; mucous cell of stomach; lacrimal gland; pyloric antrum; Paneth cell; right lung lobe; left colon; substantia nigra; More reference expression data
BioGPS	n/a
Gene ontology
Molecular function	sequence-specific DNA binding; protein domain specific binding; DNA-binding transcription activator activity, RNA polymerase II-specific; transcription factor binding; DNA-binding transcription factor activity; DNA binding; protein binding; DNA-binding transcription factor activity, RNA polymerase II-specific
Cellular component	microvillus; nucleus; fibrillar center; nucleoplasm
Biological process	Notch signaling pathway; prostate gland stromal morphogenesis; dopaminergic neuron differentiation; positive regulation of intracellular estrogen receptor signaling pathway; response to estradiol; regulation of transcription, DNA-templated; lung morphogenesis; glucose homeostasis; positive regulation of smoothened signaling pathway; lung development; regulation of transcription by RNA polymerase II; neuron fate specification; anatomical structure formation involved in morphogenesis; positive regulation of mitotic cell cycle; positive regulation of DNA-binding transcription factor activity; negative regulation of transcription by RNA polymerase II; transcription by RNA polymerase II; tube morphogenesis; secretory columnal luminar epithelial cell differentiation involved in prostate glandular acinus development; transcription, DNA-templated; regulation of cell cycle; multicellular organism development; prostate gland epithelium morphogenesis; connective tissue development; positive regulation of neuron differentiation; epithelial cell maturation involved in prostate gland development; regulation of gene expression; lung epithelial cell differentiation; dorsal/ventral neural tube patterning; epithelial-mesenchymal signaling involved in prostate gland development; epithelial tube branching involved in lung morphogenesis; respiratory basal cell differentiation; hormone metabolic process; alveolar secondary septum development; negative regulation of epithelial to mesenchymal transition; positive regulation of cell-cell adhesion mediated by cadherin; positive regulation of transcription by RNA polymerase II; chromatin remodeling; anatomical structure morphogenesis; positive regulation of apoptotic process; chromatin organization; cell differentiation
Sources:Amigo / QuickGO
Orthologs
Databases	NCBI: entry; OMA: entry
Species	Human	Mouse
Entrez	3169	15375
Ensembl	ENSG00000129514	ENSMUSG00000035451
UniProt	P55317	P35582
RefSeq (mRNA)	NM_004496	NM_008259
RefSeq (protein)	NP_004487	NP_032285
Location (UCSC)	Chr 14: 37.59 – 37.6 Mb	Chr 12: 57.59 – 57.59 Mb
PubMed search
- Wikidata
View/Edit Human	View/Edit Mouse

Forkhead box protein A1 (FOXA1), also known as hepatocyte nuclear factor 3-alpha (HNF-3A), is a protein that in humans is encoded by the FOXA1 gene.

== Structure ==
FOXA1 is a member of the forkhead domain transcription factor family. The forkhead domain is essential for its DNA-binding function, and consists of three alpha helices, three beta strands, and two loops (called "wings"). The domain binds along the DNA major groove and the wings directly contact the DNA.

FOXA1 is modified by the O-GlcNAc post-translational modification.

== Function ==
FOXA1 is a pioneer factor, a transcription factor that directly binds condensed chromatin, facilitating the binding of other transcription factors. In prostate cells, FOXA1 interacts with the androgen receptor (AR) to drive transcription of prostate-specific genes.

FOXA1 is a member of the forkhead class of DNA-binding proteins. Similar family members in mice have roles in the regulation of metabolism and in the differentiation of the pancreas and liver.

== Clinical significance ==
=== Role in cancer ===
FOXA1 is one of the most frequently altered genes in prostate cancer, with mutations in the coding sequence of up to 9% of localized prostate cancer cases, and 13% of metastatic treatment-resistant prostate cancers. Most cancer-associated FOXA1 mutations are missense mutations, changing the amino acid sequence of the fork head domain's DNA-binding sites.

Expression of FOXA1 correlates with two EMT markers, namely Twist1 and E-cadherin in breast cancer.

FOXA1 is mutated in approximately 10% of primary prostate cancer (PCa), and this percentage increases in metastatic castration-resistant prostate cancer (CRPC). A 2025 study found that distinct mutational classes of FOXA1 diverge to drive tumor progression or therapy-resistant cellular plasticity, with Class 1 mutations promoting androgen-dependent adenocarcinomas through coactivation of mTORC1/2 and oncogenic AR signaling.

=== Marker in breast cancer ===
FOXA1 in breast cancer is highly correlated with ERα^{+}, GATA3^{+}, and PR^{+} protein expression as well as endocrine signaling. FOXA1 acts as a pioneer factor for ERa in ERα^{+} breast cancer, and its expression might identify ERα^{+} cancers that undergo rapid reprogramming of ERa signaling that is associated with poor outcomes and treatment resistance. Conversely, in ERα^{−} breast cancer FOXA1 is highly correlated with low-grade morphology and improved disease free survival. FOXA1 is a downstream target of GATA3 in the mammary gland. Expression in ERα^{−} cancers may identify a subset of tumors that is responsive to other endocrine therapies such as androgen receptor antagonist treatment.

== Chemical probe development ==
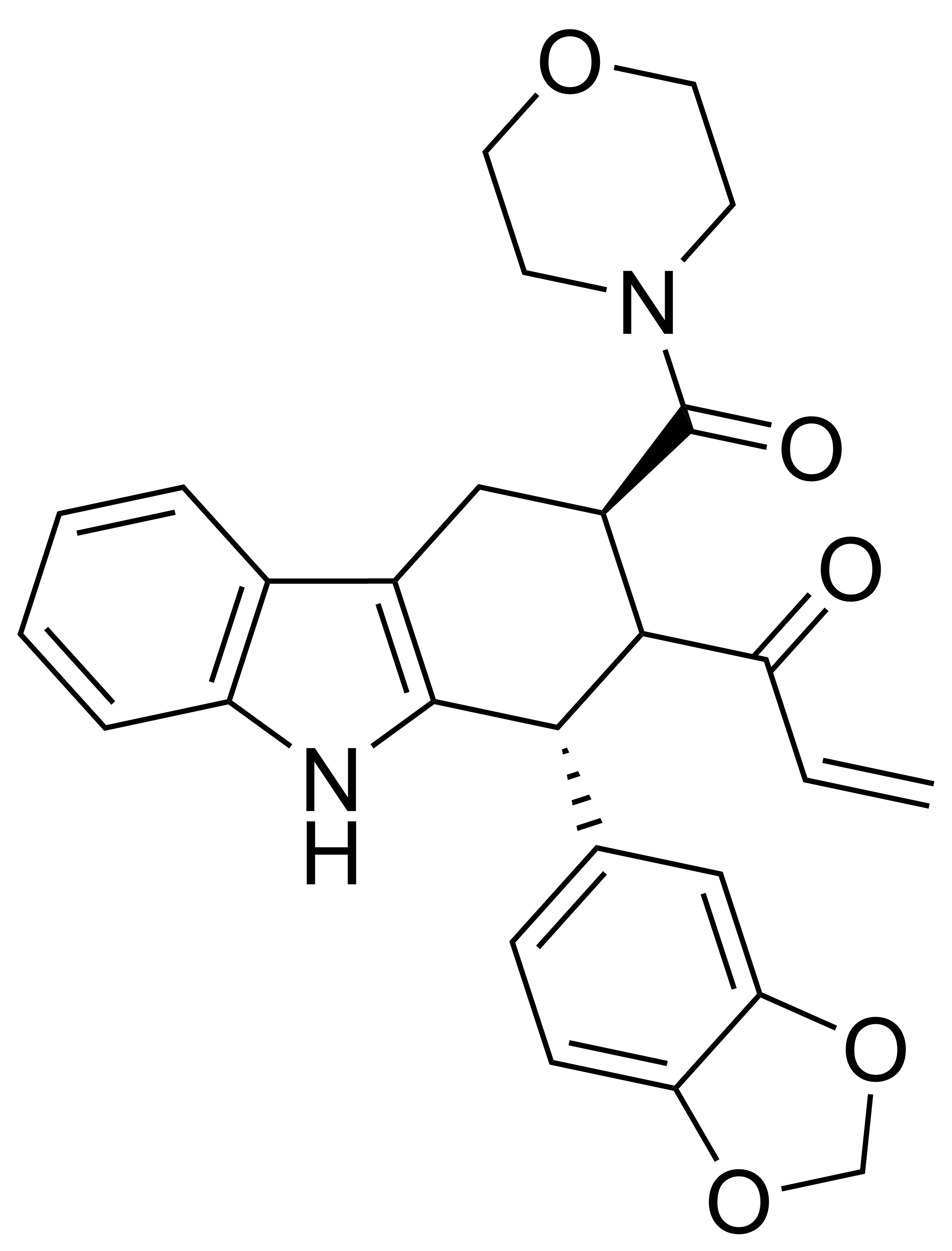
Chemical structure of WX-02-23.

Being a transcription factor lacking structurally ordered small molecule-binding sites, FOXA1 has generally been considered to be an undruggable protein. Using a chemical proteomics approach directed against cysteines, researchers from Scripps Research identified a tryptoline acrylamide chemical probe WX-02-23 that reacts with FOXA1 C258 site-specifically and stereospecifically. WX-02-23 binds FOXA1 in a DNA-dependent manner, and WX-02-23 likewise enhances FOXA1 interaction with DNA.
