= MED14 =

Protein-coding gene in humans

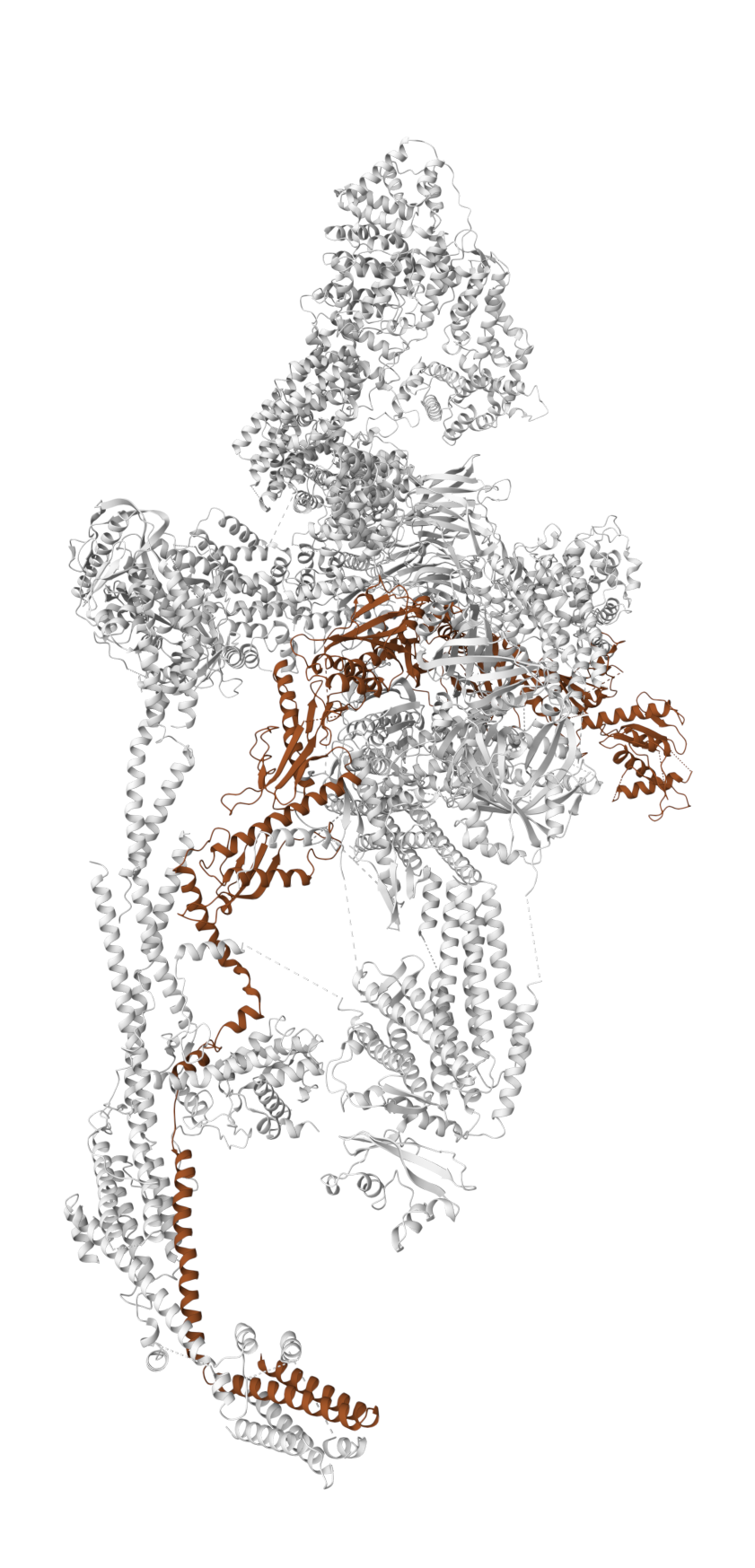

Identifiers
- Aliases: MED14, CRSP150, CRSP2, CSRP, CXorf4, DRIP150, EXLM1, RGR1, TRAP170, mediator complex subunit 14
- External IDs: OMIM: 300182; MGI: 1349442; GeneCards: MED14

Gene location (Human)
Chr.	X chromosome (human)
Band	Xp11.4	Start	40,648,305 bp
Band	Xp11.4	End	40,735,858 bp

Gene location (Mouse)
Chr.	X chromosome (mouse)
Band	X|X A1.1	Start	12,541,608 bp
Band	X|X A1.1	End	12,628,312 bp
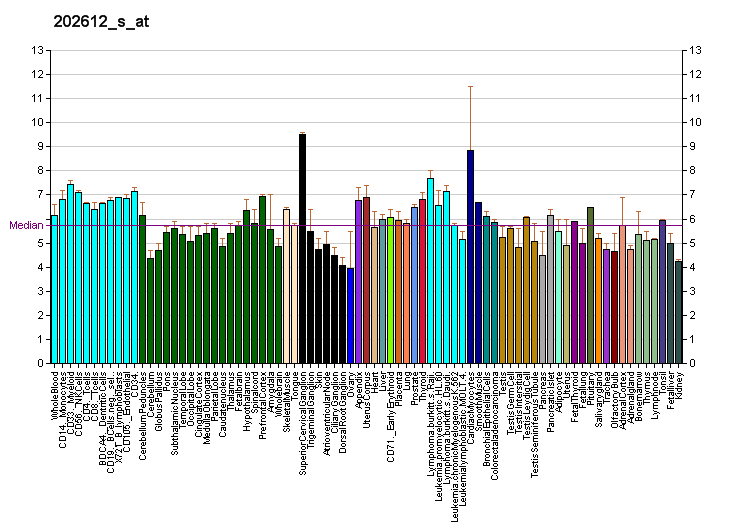

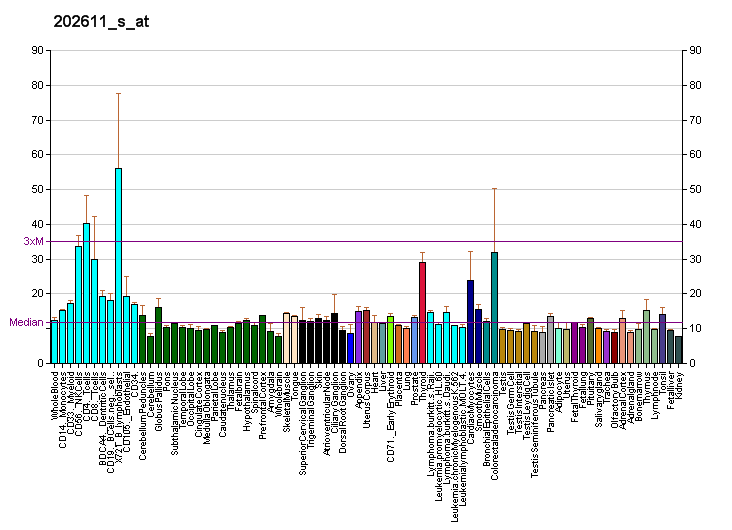

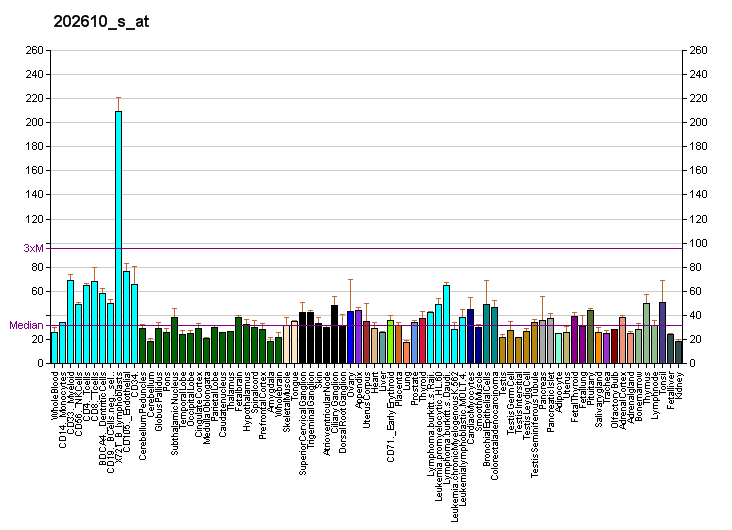
RNA expression pattern
Bgee	Human / Mouse (ortholog); Top expressed in: secondary oocyte; jejunal mucosa; cartilage tissue; muscle of thigh; gastrocnemius muscle; ventricular zone; vastus lateralis muscle; biceps brachii; skeletal muscle tissue; Skeletal muscle tissue of rectus abdominis / Top expressed in: genital tubercle; tail of embryo; medullary collecting duct; hair follicle; condyle; renal corpuscle; secondary oocyte; endocardial cushion; atrioventricular valve; conjunctival fornix; More reference expression data
BioGPS	More reference expression data
Gene ontology
Molecular function	transcription coactivator activity; transcription coregulator activity; protein binding; nuclear receptor coactivator activity; vitamin D receptor binding; signaling receptor activity
Cellular component	membrane; core mediator complex; mediator complex; nucleoplasm; nucleus
Biological process	androgen receptor signaling pathway; regulation of transcription, DNA-templated; regulation of transcription by RNA polymerase II; intracellular steroid hormone receptor signaling pathway; transcription, DNA-templated; stem cell population maintenance; positive regulation of transcription, DNA-templated; transcription initiation from RNA polymerase II promoter; positive regulation of transcription by RNA polymerase II
Sources:Amigo / QuickGO
Orthologs
Databases	NCBI: entry; OMA: entry
Species	Human	Mouse
Entrez	9282	26896
Ensembl	ENSG00000180182	ENSMUSG00000064127
UniProt	O60244	A2ABV5
RefSeq (mRNA)	NM_004229	NM_001048208; NM_012005
RefSeq (protein)	NP_004220	NP_001041673; NP_036135
Location (UCSC)	Chr X: 40.65 – 40.74 Mb	Chr X: 12.54 – 12.63 Mb
PubMed search
- Wikidata
View/Edit Human	View/Edit Mouse

Mediator of RNA polymerase II transcription subunit 14 is an enzyme that in humans is encoded by the MED14 gene.

The activation of gene transcription is a multistep process that is triggered by factors that recognize transcriptional enhancer sites in DNA. These factors work with co-activators to direct transcriptional initiation by the RNA polymerase II apparatus. The protein encoded by this gene is a subunit of the CRSP (cofactor required for SP1 activation) complex, which, along with TFIID, is required for efficient activation by SP1. This protein is also a component of other multisubunit complexes e.g. thyroid hormone receptor-(TR-) associated proteins which interact with TR and facilitate TR function on DNA templates in conjunction with initiation factors and cofactors. This protein contains a bipartite nuclear localization signal. This gene is known to escape chromosome X-inactivation.

== Interactions ==
MED14 has been shown to interact with PPARGC1A, Estrogen receptor alpha, STAT2, Cyclin-dependent kinase 8, Glucocorticoid receptor and Hepatocyte nuclear factor 4 alpha.
