= PAX5 =

Protein-coding gene in humans

Identifiers
- Aliases: PAX5, ALL3, BSAP, paired box 5, PAX-5
- External IDs: OMIM: 167414; MGI: 97489; GeneCards: PAX5
Available structures
PDB	Ortholog search: PDBe RCSB
PDB	List of PDB id codes 1K78, 1MDM

Gene location (Human)
Chr.	Chromosome 9 (human)
Band	9p13.2	Start	36,833,269 bp
Band	9p13.2	End	37,034,268 bp

Gene location (Mouse)
Chr.	Chromosome 4 (mouse)
Band	4 B1|4 23.55 cM	Start	44,524,757 bp
Band	4 B1|4 23.55 cM	End	44,710,487 bp
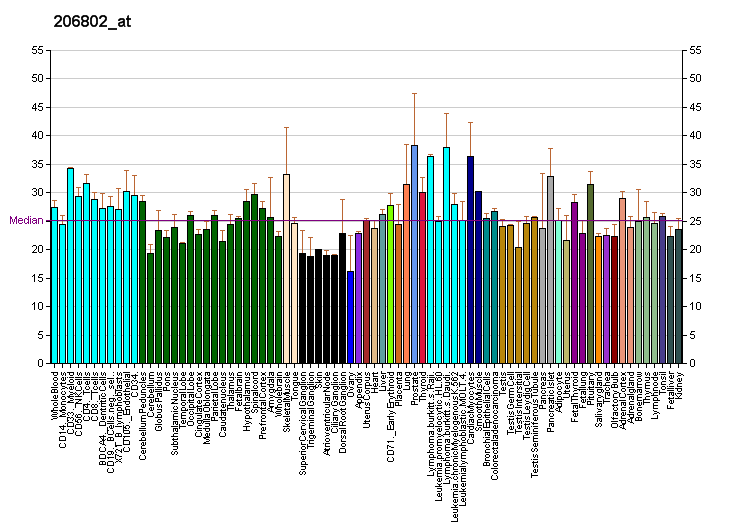

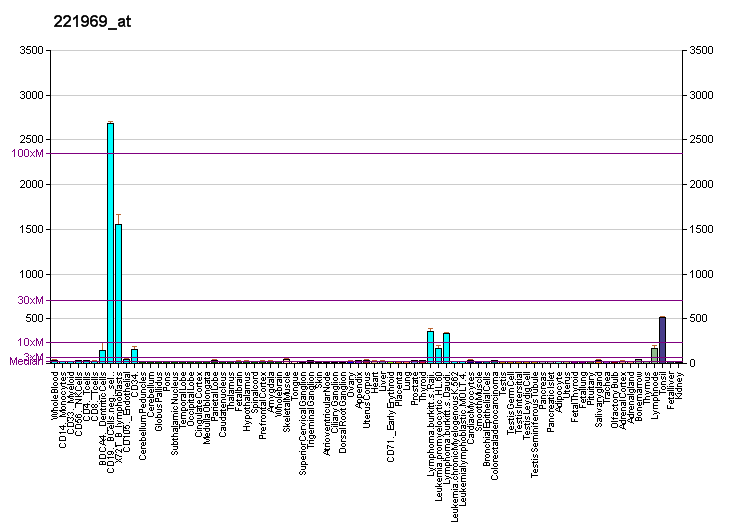
RNA expression pattern
Bgee	Human / Mouse (ortholog); Top expressed in: buccal mucosa cell; epithelium of nasopharynx; lymph node; appendix; bone marrow cell; spleen; mucosa of ileum; granulocyte; blood; tonsil / Top expressed in: spleen; mesenteric lymph nodes; blood; female urethra; substantia nigra; lumbar subsegment of spinal cord; secondary oocyte; zygote; granulocyte; lumbar spinal ganglion; More reference expression data
BioGPS	More reference expression data
Gene ontology
Molecular function	DNA binding; DNA-binding transcription factor activity; DNA-binding transcription activator activity, RNA polymerase II-specific; RNA polymerase II cis-regulatory region sequence-specific DNA binding; protein binding; DNA-binding transcription factor activity, RNA polymerase II-specific
Cellular component	nucleus; fibrillar center; cytosol; intracellular membrane-bounded organelle; nucleoplasm
Biological process	cell differentiation; regulation of transcription, DNA-templated; lateral ventricle development; ageing; negative regulation of transcription by RNA polymerase II; transcription, DNA-templated; nervous system development; multicellular organism development; adult behavior; humoral immune response; spermatogenesis; negative regulation of histone H3-K9 methylation; cerebral cortex development; animal organ morphogenesis; skeletal muscle cell differentiation; embryonic cranial skeleton morphogenesis; positive regulation of transcription by RNA polymerase II; transcription by RNA polymerase II; regulation of B cell receptor signaling pathway
Sources:Amigo / QuickGO
Orthologs
Databases	NCBI: entry; OMA: entry
Species	Human	Mouse
Entrez	5079	18507
Ensembl	ENSG00000196092	ENSMUSG00000014030
UniProt	Q02548	Q02650
RefSeq (mRNA)	NM_001280547; NM_001280548; NM_001280549; NM_001280550; NM_001280551 NM_001280552; NM_001280553; NM_001280554; NM_001280555; NM_001280556; NM_016734	NM_008782
RefSeq (protein)	NP_001267476; NP_001267477; NP_001267478; NP_001267479; NP_001267480 NP_001267481; NP_001267482; NP_001267483; NP_001267484; NP_001267485; NP_057953; NP_001267480.1	NP_032808
Location (UCSC)	Chr 9: 36.83 – 37.03 Mb	Chr 4: 44.52 – 44.71 Mb
PubMed search
- Wikidata
View/Edit Human	View/Edit Mouse

Paired box protein Pax-5 is a protein that in humans is encoded by the PAX5 gene.

== Function ==
The PAX5 gene is a member of the paired box (PAX) family of transcription factors. The central feature of this gene family is a novel, highly conserved DNA-binding domain, known as the paired box. The PAX proteins are important regulators in early development, and alterations in the expression of their genes are thought to contribute to neoplastic transformation. The PAX5 gene encodes the B-cell lineage specific activator protein (BSAP) that is expressed at early, but not late stages of B-cell differentiation. Its expression has also been detected in developing CNS and testis, therefore, PAX5 gene product may not only play an important role in B-cell differentiation, but also in neural development and spermatogenesis.

== Clinical significance ==
The PAX5 gene is located in chromosome 9p13 region, which is involved in t(9;14)(p13;q32) translocations recurring in small lymphocytic lymphomas of the plasmacytoid subtype, and in derived large-cell lymphomas. This translocation brings the potent E-mu enhancer of the IgH gene locus into close proximity of the PAX5 promoters, suggesting that the deregulation of PAX5 gene transcription contributes to the pathogenesis of these lymphomas.

Up to 97% of the Reed–Sternberg cells of Hodgkin's lymphoma express Pax-5.

== Interactions ==
PAX5 has been shown to interact with TLE4 and Death associated protein 6.

== See also ==
- Pax genes
