= Cadherin related family member 3 =

Protein found in humans

CDHR3

Identifiers
- Aliases: CDHR3, CDH28, cadherin related family member 3
- External IDs: OMIM: 615610; MGI: 1916014; GeneCards: CDHR3

Gene location (Human)
Chr.	Chromosome 7 (human)
Band	7q22.3	Start	105,876,796 bp
Band	7q22.3	End	106,036,432 bp

Gene location (Mouse)
Chr.	Chromosome 12 (mouse)
Band	12|12 A3	Start	33,083,795 bp
Band	12|12 A3	End	33,142,874 bp
RNA expression pattern
Bgee	Human / Mouse (ortholog); Top expressed in: right uterine tube; bronchial epithelial cell; olfactory zone of nasal mucosa; mucosa of paranasal sinus; right lung; cerebellar hemisphere; right hemisphere of cerebellum; epithelium of nasopharynx; gastric mucosa; muscle layer of sigmoid colon / Top expressed in: olfactory epithelium; right lung lobe; left lung lobe; Epithelium of choroid plexus; aorta; esophagus; paraventricular nucleus of hypothalamus; dentate gyrus; dentate gyrus of hippocampal formation granule cell; habenula; More reference expression data
BioGPS	n/a
Gene ontology
Molecular function	calcium ion binding; virus receptor activity; cytoskeletal protein binding; protein homodimerization activity; cadherin binding
Cellular component	integral component of membrane; plasma membrane; membrane; cell surface; catenin complex
Biological process	viral entry into host cell; cell adhesion; viral process; homophilic cell adhesion via plasma membrane adhesion molecules; cell-cell junction assembly; calcium-dependent cell-cell adhesion via plasma membrane cell adhesion molecules; adherens junction organization; cell-cell adhesion mediated by cadherin; cell-cell adhesion; cell morphogenesis
Sources:Amigo / QuickGO
Orthologs
Databases	NCBI: entry; OMA: entry
Species	Human	Mouse
Entrez	222256	68764
Ensembl	ENSG00000128536	ENSMUSG00000035860
UniProt	Q6ZTQ4	Q8BL00
RefSeq (mRNA)	NM_001301161; NM_152750	NM_001024478
RefSeq (protein)	NP_001288090; NP_689963	NP_001019649
Location (UCSC)	Chr 7: 105.88 – 106.04 Mb	Chr 12: 33.08 – 33.14 Mb
PubMed search
- Wikidata
View/Edit Human	View/Edit Mouse

Cadherin related family member 3 (CDHR3), also known as CDH28 or its abbreviation CDHR3, is a protein that in humans is encoded by the CDHR3 gene. The protein is predominately expressed in respiratory epithelium and the first notion of its clinical implications was from the discovery that genetic variation of CDHR3 is strongly associated to early severe asthma exacerbations in children. Subsequent studies have suggested that CDHR3 is a receptor for a subtype of rhinovirus.

== Function and cellular location ==
The exact physiological role of CDHR3 is not known, but as the CDHR3 protein is expressed in epithelial tissues and has six extracellular cadherin domains plus a short transmembrane segment, it is believed to be related to the function of similar cadherins which function in cell adhesion and cell-to-cell signaling. Two single-cell RNA expression studies furthermore found CDHR3 to be highly selectively expressed in ciliated epithelial cells, compared to other cell types in the respiratory epithelium, and thereby to be a marker for ciliated cells in respiratory airway tissue.

== Clinical significance ==
A nonsynonymous mutation in CDHR3 at rs6967330 (C529Y) was at first found to be associated with severe asthma exacerbations in early childhood, with genome-wide significance. Functional experiments further indicated that this gene polymorphism leads to increased surface expression of the CDHR3 protein. A subsequent study found that CDHR3 is a probable receptor for rhinovirus type C, a common form of rhinovirus.

Recent studies furthermore found that CDHR3 gene variation is not associated with childhood bronchiolitis from respiratory syncytial virus (RSV) infection, which resemble early asthma exacerbations as a phenotype. However, childhood bronchiolitis not caused by RSV infection, of which rhinovirus is often implicated, was associated with the CDHR3 gene variation. This is in line with the results from a study on chronic rhinosinusitis, which often is associated with rhinovirus infection, where CDHR3 gene variation also was found to be a strong risk factor. Therefore, CDHR3 seems causally linked to increased propensity for rhinovirus C infection.
