= NFYC =

Protein-coding gene in humans

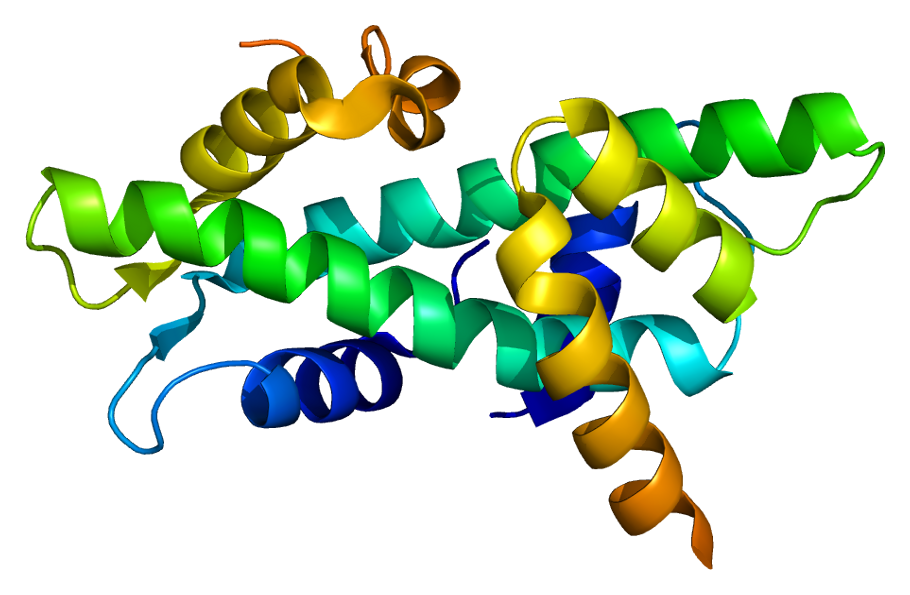

Identifiers
- Aliases: NFYC, CBF-C, CBFC, H1TF2A, HAP5, HSM, NF-YC, nuclear transcription factor Y subunit gamma
- External IDs: OMIM: 605344; MGI: 107901; GeneCards: NFYC
Available structures
PDB	Ortholog search: PDBe RCSB
PDB	List of PDB id codes 1N1J, 4AWL, 4CSR

Gene location (Human)
Chr.	Chromosome 1 (human)
Band	1p34.2	Start	40,691,648 bp
Band	1p34.2	End	40,771,603 bp

Gene location (Mouse)
Chr.	Chromosome 4 (mouse)
Band	4 D2.1|4 56.52 cM	Start	120,614,635 bp
Band	4 D2.1|4 56.52 cM	End	120,688,769 bp
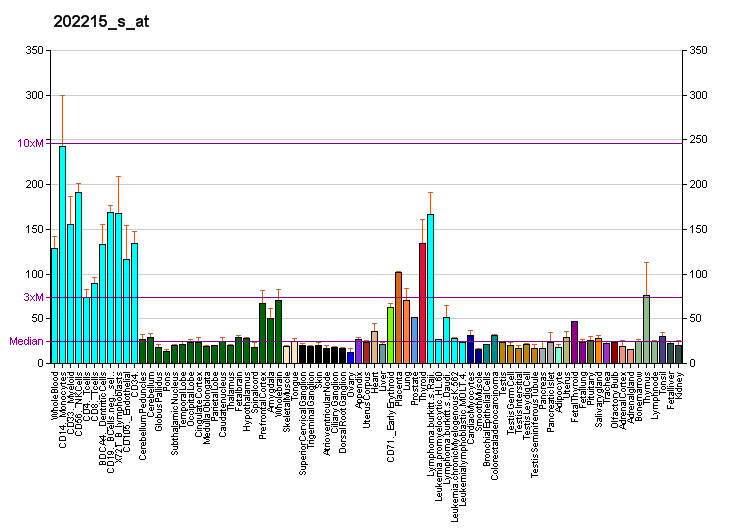

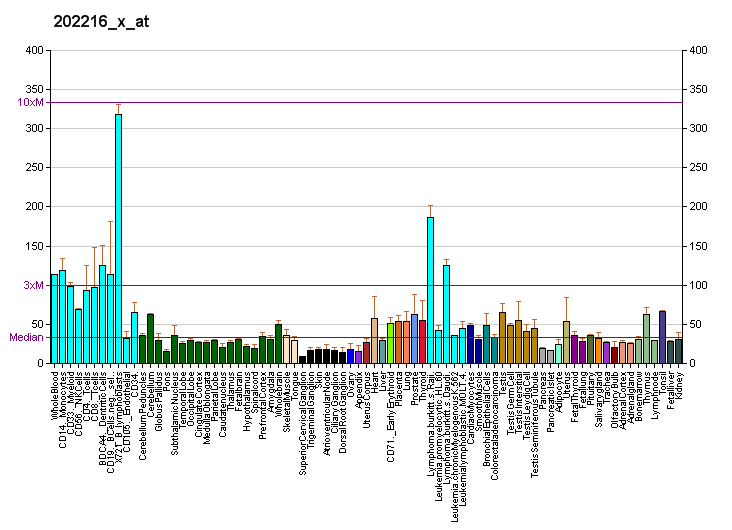

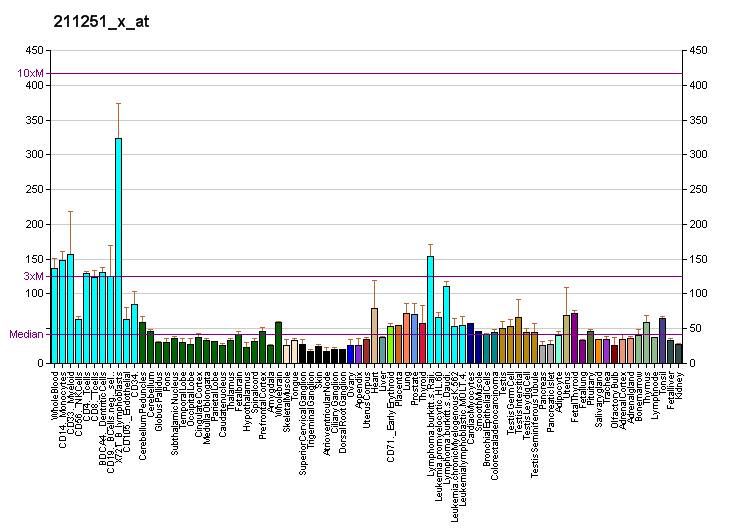
RNA expression pattern
Bgee	Human / Mouse (ortholog); Top expressed in: buccal mucosa cell; apex of heart; muscle of thigh; monocyte; tendon of biceps brachii; right lobe of thyroid gland; right auricle of heart; gastrocnemius muscle; ganglionic eminence; skin of abdomen / Top expressed in: secondary oocyte; zygote; primary oocyte; genital tubercle; tail of embryo; thymus; heart; cerebellar cortex; bone marrow; olfactory bulb; More reference expression data
BioGPS	More reference expression data
Gene ontology
Molecular function	DNA-binding transcription factor activity; RNA polymerase II cis-regulatory region sequence-specific DNA binding; DNA binding; transcription coactivator activity; DNA-binding transcription activator activity, RNA polymerase II-specific; protein binding; protein heterodimerization activity; DNA-binding transcription factor activity, RNA polymerase II-specific; transcription factor binding; sequence-specific DNA binding
Cellular component	CCAAT-binding factor complex; protein-DNA complex; nucleus; nucleoplasm; RNA polymerase II transcription regulator complex
Biological process	regulation of transcription by RNA polymerase II; positive regulation of transcription, DNA-templated; regulation of transcription, DNA-templated; transcription by RNA polymerase II; protein folding; transcription, DNA-templated; positive regulation of transcription by RNA polymerase II; regulation of cholesterol biosynthetic process; negative regulation of transcription, DNA-templated
Sources:Amigo / QuickGO
Orthologs
Databases	NCBI: entry; OMA: entry
Species	Human	Mouse
Entrez	4802	18046
Ensembl	ENSG00000066136	ENSMUSG00000032897
UniProt	Q13952	P70353
RefSeq (mRNA)	NM_001142587; NM_001142588; NM_001142589; NM_001142590; NM_001308114 NM_001308115; NM_014223	NM_001048168; NM_001277095; NM_008692; NM_001357192; NM_001357193 NM_001357194
RefSeq (protein)	NP_001136059; NP_001136060; NP_001136061; NP_001136062; NP_001295043 NP_001295044; NP_055038	NP_001041633; NP_001264024; NP_032718; NP_001344121; NP_001344122 NP_001344123
Location (UCSC)	Chr 1: 40.69 – 40.77 Mb	Chr 4: 120.61 – 120.69 Mb
PubMed search
- Wikidata
View/Edit Human	View/Edit Mouse

Nuclear transcription factor Y subunit gamma is a protein that in humans is encoded by the NFYC gene.

== Function ==
The protein encoded by this gene is one subunit of a trimeric complex, forming a highly conserved transcription factor that binds with high specificity to CCAAT motifs in the promoter regions in a variety of genes. This gene product, subunit C, forms a tight dimer with the B subunit (NFYB), a prerequisite for subunit A (NFYA) association. The resulting trimer binds to DNA with high specificity and affinity. Subunits B and C each contain a histone-like motif. Observation of the histone nature of these subunits is supported by two types of evidence; protein sequence alignments and experiments with mutants. Additional regulation, preliminarily supported by the EST database, may be represented by alternative splicing in this subunit.

Two microRNAs, miR-30c and miR-30e, are located within introns of the nfyc gene. These microRNAs are actively transcribed in human insulin-producing beta cells in the pancreatic islets that also show high expression of nfyc and CDH1 genes. The expression of these intronic microRNAs is essential for maintaining the differentiated phenotype of human islet beta cells. Inhibition of miR-30 family microRNAs induces epithelial–mesenchymal transition of human pancreatic islet cells.

== Interactions ==
NFYC has been shown to interact with Myc.
