= ZHX1 =

Protein-coding gene in the species Homo sapiens

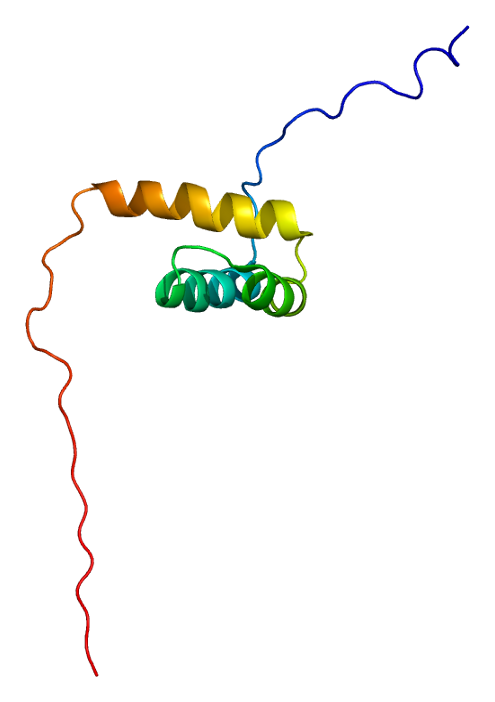

Identifiers
- Aliases: ZHX1, zinc fingers and homeoboxes 1
- External IDs: OMIM: 604764; MGI: 109271; GeneCards: ZHX1
Available structures
PDB	Ortholog search: PDBe RCSB
PDB	List of PDB id codes 2ECB, 2GHF, 2LY9, 3NAR

Gene location (Human)
Chr.	Chromosome 8 (human)
Band	8q24.13	Start	123,248,451 bp
Band	8q24.13	End	123,275,541 bp

Gene location (Mouse)
Chr.	Chromosome 15 (mouse)
Band	15|15 D1	Start	57,910,399 bp
Band	15|15 D1	End	57,939,937 bp
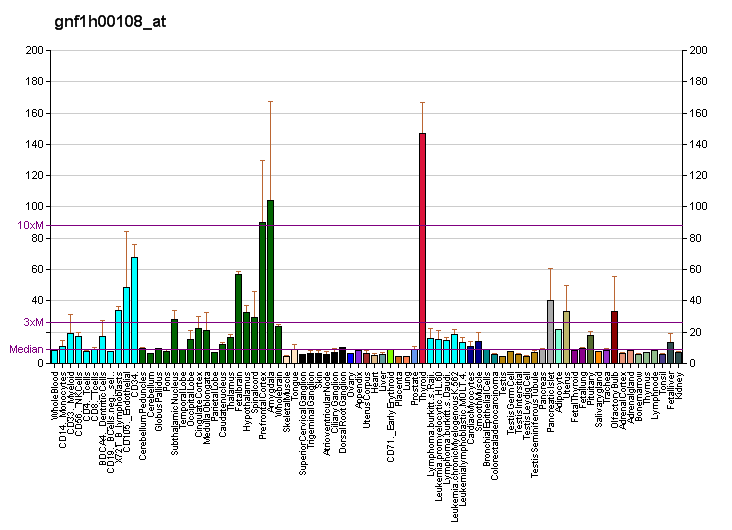
RNA expression pattern
Bgee	Human / Mouse (ortholog); Top expressed in: skin of arm; secondary oocyte; Achilles tendon; epithelium of lactiferous gland; lactiferous duct; pars reticulata; cerebellar vermis; internal globus pallidus; medulla oblongata; superior vestibular nucleus / Top expressed in: genital tubercle; spermatocyte; white adipose tissue; uterus; hippocampus proper; dentate gyrus of hippocampal formation granule cell; tail of embryo; ovary; quadriceps femoris muscle; muscle of thigh; More reference expression data
BioGPS	More reference expression data
Gene ontology
Molecular function	DNA-binding transcription factor activity; DNA binding; protein binding; transcription corepressor activity; metal ion binding; protein heterodimerization activity; nucleic acid binding; DNA-binding transcription factor activity, RNA polymerase II-specific
Cellular component	nucleus; nucleoplasm
Biological process	cell differentiation; negative regulation of transcription, DNA-templated; regulation of transcription, DNA-templated; negative regulation of transcription by RNA polymerase II; transcription, DNA-templated
Sources:Amigo / QuickGO
Orthologs
Databases	NCBI: entry; OMA: entry
Species	Human	Mouse
Entrez	11244	22770
Ensembl	ENSG00000165156	ENSMUSG00000022361
UniProt	Q9UKY1	P70121
RefSeq (mRNA)	NM_001017926; NM_007222	NM_001042438; NM_009572
RefSeq (protein)	NP_001017926; NP_009153	NP_001035903; NP_033598
Location (UCSC)	Chr 8: 123.25 – 123.28 Mb	Chr 15: 57.91 – 57.94 Mb
PubMed search
- Wikidata
View/Edit Human	View/Edit Mouse

Zinc fingers and homeoboxes protein 1 is a protein that in humans is encoded by the ZHX1 gene.

The members of the zinc fingers and homeoboxes gene family are nuclear homodimeric transcriptional repressors that interact with the A subunit of nuclear factor-Y (NF-YA) and contain two C2H2-type zinc fingers and five homeobox DNA-binding domains. This gene encodes member 1 of this gene family. In addition to forming homodimers, this protein heterodimerizes with members 2 and 3 of the zinc fingers and homeoboxes family. Alternative splicing results in multiple transcript variants encoding the same protein.

== Interactions ==
ZHX1 has been shown to interact with NFYA.
