= MEOX2 =

Protein-coding gene in the species Homo sapiens

Identifiers
- Aliases: MEOX2, GAX, MOX2, mesenchyme homeobox 2
- External IDs: OMIM: 600535; MGI: 103219; GeneCards: MEOX2

Gene location (Human)
| Chr. | Chromosome 7 (human) |
| Band | 7p21.2 | Start | 15,611,212 bp |
| Band | 7p21.2 | End | 15,686,683 bp |

Gene location (Mouse)
| Chr. | Chromosome 12 (mouse) |
| Band | 12 A3|12 16.84 cM | Start | 37,158,539 bp |
| Band | 12 A3|12 16.84 cM | End | 37,229,533 bp |
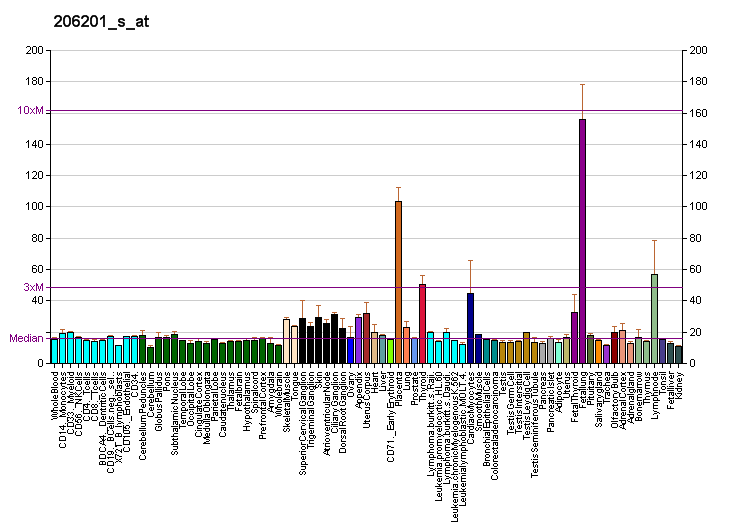
RNA expression pattern
| Bgee | Human / Mouse (ortholog); Top expressed in: Achilles tendon; parietal pleura; spinal ganglia; tibial nerve; synovial joint; subcutaneous adipose tissue; tendon of biceps brachii; saphenous vein; sural nerve; trigeminal ganglion / Top expressed in: left lung lobe; sciatic nerve; lumbar spinal ganglion; dermis; hand; foot; ankle; human fetus; carotid body; limb bud; More reference expression data |
| BioGPS | More reference expression data |
Gene ontology
| Molecular function | RNA polymerase II cis-regulatory region sequence-specific DNA binding; sequence-specific DNA binding; DNA binding; DNA-binding transcription factor activity; DNA-binding transcription activator activity, RNA polymerase II-specific; protein binding; DNA-binding transcription factor activity, RNA polymerase II-specific |
| Cellular component | cytoplasm; nuclear speck; nucleus |
| Biological process | neuron death; roof of mouth development; regulation of transcription, DNA-templated; somite specification; blood circulation; transcription, DNA-templated; limb development; multicellular organism development; angiogenesis; skeletal muscle tissue development; positive regulation of transcription by RNA polymerase II; negative regulation of cell migration involved in sprouting angiogenesis; transcription by RNA polymerase II; somite development |
Sources:Amigo / QuickGO
Orthologs
| Databases | NCBI: entry; OMA: entry |
| Species | Human | Mouse |
| Entrez | 4223 | 17286 |
| Ensembl | ENSG00000106511 | ENSMUSG00000036144 |
| UniProt | P50222 | P32443 |
| RefSeq (mRNA) | NM_005924 | NM_008584 |
| RefSeq (protein) | NP_005915 | NP_032610 |
| Location (UCSC) | Chr 7: 15.61 – 15.69 Mb | Chr 12: 37.16 – 37.23 Mb |
| PubMed search |
- Wikidata
| View/Edit Human | View/Edit Mouse |

Mesenchyme homeobox 2 (MEOX2) is a protein that in humans is encoded by the MEOX2 gene.

== Function ==
This gene encodes a member of a subfamily of non-clustered, diverged, antennapedia-like homeobox-containing transcription factor genes. The encoded protein may play a role in the regulation of vertebrate limb myogenesis. Mutations in the related mouse protein may be associated with craniofacial and/or skeletal abnormalities, in addition to neurovascular dysfunction observed in Alzheimer's disease. MEOX2 has been implicated in the initiation of tumors in glioma. Additionally, MEOX2 influences several critical processes in lung cancer, including cellular proliferation, invasion, metastasis, angiogenesis, and the development of drug resistance.

== Interactions ==
MEOX2 has been shown to interact with PAX1 and PAX3.
