= NFYA =

Protein-coding gene in the species Homo sapiens

Identifiers
- Aliases: NFYA, CBF-A, CBF-B, HAP2, NF-YA, nuclear transcription factor Y subunit alpha
- External IDs: OMIM: 189903; MGI: 97316; GeneCards: NFYA
Available structures
PDB	Ortholog search: PDBe RCSB
PDB	List of PDB id codes 4AWL

Gene location (Human)
Chr.	Chromosome 6 (human)
Band	6p21.1	Start	41,072,974 bp
Band	6p21.1	End	41,102,403 bp

Gene location (Mouse)
Chr.	Chromosome 17 (mouse)
Band	17 C|17 23.99 cM	Start	48,693,913 bp
Band	17 C|17 23.99 cM	End	48,716,934 bp
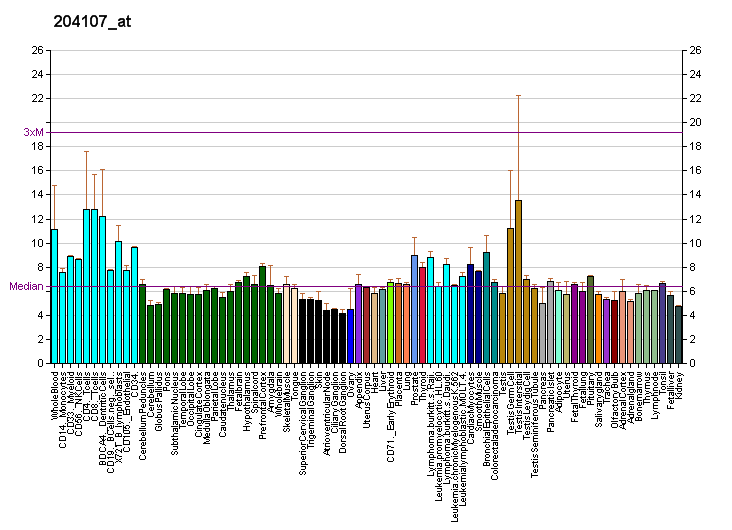

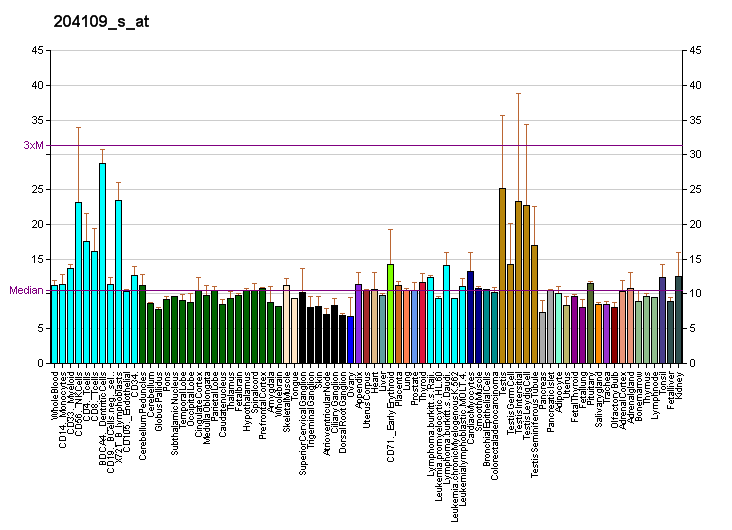

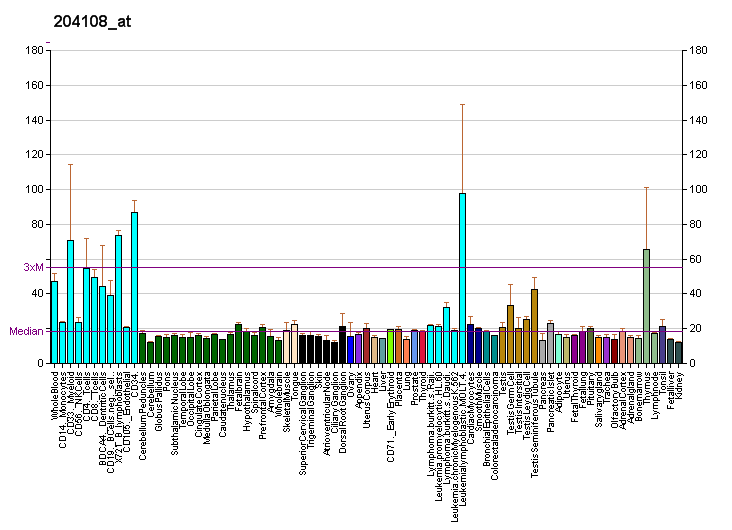
RNA expression pattern
Bgee	Human / Mouse (ortholog); Top expressed in: buccal mucosa cell; ganglionic eminence; right testis; left testis; sperm; secondary oocyte; testicle; bone marrow cell; islet of Langerhans; monocyte / Top expressed in: secondary oocyte; primary oocyte; zygote; genital tubercle; tail of embryo; ganglionic eminence; thymus; granulocyte; yolk sac; placenta; More reference expression data
BioGPS	More reference expression data
Gene ontology
Molecular function	DNA-binding transcription factor activity; DNA binding; core promoter sequence-specific DNA binding; protein binding; RNA polymerase II cis-regulatory region sequence-specific DNA binding; DNA-binding transcription factor activity, RNA polymerase II-specific
Cellular component	CCAAT-binding factor complex; protein-DNA complex; nucleus; nucleoplasm; RNA polymerase II transcription regulator complex
Biological process	positive regulation of transcription, DNA-templated; regulation of transcription, DNA-templated; transcription by RNA polymerase II; transcription, DNA-templated; rhythmic process; regulation of cholesterol biosynthetic process; regulation of transcription by RNA polymerase II
Sources:Amigo / QuickGO
Orthologs
Databases	NCBI: entry; OMA: entry
Species	Human	Mouse
Entrez	4800	18044
Ensembl	ENSG00000001167	ENSMUSG00000023994
UniProt	P23511	P23708
RefSeq (mRNA)	NM_021705; NM_002505	NM_001110832; NM_010913; NM_001347401; NM_001347402; NM_001374803
RefSeq (protein)	NP_002496; NP_068351	NP_001104302; NP_001334330; NP_001334331; NP_035043; NP_001361732
Location (UCSC)	Chr 6: 41.07 – 41.1 Mb	Chr 17: 48.69 – 48.72 Mb
PubMed search
- Wikidata
View/Edit Human	View/Edit Mouse

Nuclear transcription factor Y subunit alpha is a protein that in humans is encoded by the NFYA gene.

== Function ==
The protein encoded by this gene is one subunit of a trimeric complex NF-Y, forming a highly conserved transcription factor that binds to CCAAT motifs in the promoter regions in a variety of genes. Subunit NFYA associates with a tight dimer composed of the NFYB and NFYC subunits, resulting in a trimer that binds to DNA with high specificity and affinity. The sequence specific interactions of the complex are made by the NFYA subunit, suggesting a role as the regulatory subunit. In addition, there is evidence of post-transcriptional regulation in this gene product, either by protein degradation or control of translation. Further regulation is represented by alternative splicing in the glutamine-rich activation domain, with clear tissue-specific preferences for the two isoforms.

NF-Y complex serves as a pioneer factor by promoting chromatin accessibility to facilitate other co-localizing cell type-specific transcription factors.

NF-Y has also been implicated as a central player in transcription start site (TSS) selection in animals. It safeguards the integrity of the nucleosome-depleted region and PIC localization at protein-coding gene promoters.

== Interactions ==
NFYA has been shown to interact with Serum response factor and ZHX1. NFYA, NFYB and NFYC form the NFY complex and it has been shown that the NFY complex serves as a pioneer factor by promoting chromatin accessibility to facilitate other co-localizing cell type-specific transcription factors.

== Structure ==
The atomic structure of the NFY heterotrimer in complex with dsDNA was resolved via X-ray crystallography (PDB ID 4awl). Using one of the NFYA alpha helices as a template, structure inspired stapled peptides were designed to disrupt the NFY heterotrimer formation by preventing NFYA from binding to the NFYB/C heterodimer.
