= List of acronyms: E =

This list contains acronyms, initialisms, and pseudo-blends that begin with the letter E.

For the purposes of this list:

- acronym = an abbreviation pronounced as if it were a word, e.g., SARS = severe acute respiratory syndrome, pronounced to rhyme with cars
- initialism = an abbreviation pronounced wholly or partly using the names of its constituent letters, e.g., CD = compact disc, pronounced cee dee
- pseudo-blend = an abbreviation whose extra or omitted letters mean that it cannot stand as a true acronym, initialism, or portmanteau (a word formed by combining two or more words).

(a) = acronym, e.g.: SARS – (a) severe acute respiratory syndrome
(i) = initialism, e.g.: CD – (i) compact disc
(p) = pseudo-blend, e.g.: UNIFEM – (p) United Nations Development Fund for Women
(s) = symbol (none of the above, representing and pronounced as something else; for example: MHz – megahertz)

Some terms are spoken as either acronym or initialism, e.g., VoIP, pronounced both as voyp and V-O-I-P.

(Main list of acronyms)

- E – (s) East
- e- – (i) Used as a prefix before unabbreviated words, stands for technical words such as electronic or emergency.

== E0–9 ==
- E^{3} or E3 – many, including Electronic Entertainment Expo, see entry
- E15 - (s) Eyjafjallajökull (Volcano in Iceland: 'E' followed by 15 letters)

== EA ==
- EA – (i) Electronic attack – Emotions Anonymous – Engagement area – Electronic Arts – Enrolled agent – Environmental assessment - Enterprise Architect – (s) Exaampere
- EABU – (i) Explain acronyms before use
- EAC – (i) Echelons Above Corps
- EAFUS – (i) "Everything" Added to Food in the United States (FDA list)
- EAPC – (i) Euro-Atlantic Partnership Council
- EASA – (i) European Aviation Safety Agency
- EAST – (a) Experimental Advanced Superconducting Tokamak

== EB ==
- EB - East Bridgewater
- EBCDIC – (a/i) Extended Binary Coded Decimal Interchange Code (pronounced "eb-see-dik") (cf. BCD)
- EBD – (i) Electronic Brake Distribution
- EBE – (i) Extraterrestrial Biological Entity
- EBO
  - (i/a) Effects Based Operations
  - Encyclopædia Britannica Online
  - European Board of Ophthalmology
- EBSA – (i) Employee Benefits Security Administration
- EBT
  - (i) Earnings Before Taxes
  - Electronic Benefit Transfer
- EBW
  - (i) Electron Beam Welding
  - Exploding BridgeWire

== EC ==
- EC
  - (a/i) Earth Constitution
  - (s) Ecuador (ISO 3166 digram; FIPS 10-4 country code)
  - (i) Electronic Combat
  - European Community (see EEC)
  - (s) Exacoulomb
- EC2 (disambiguation) – (i) Many, some as an alternative to EC2, e.g., Elastic Compute Cloud
- EC3 – (i) Ethan Carter III, ring name of American professional wrestler Michael Hutter (who currently performs as "EC3")
- ECAL — (p) Electromagnetic calorimeter
- ECASS – (i) European Centre for Analysis in the Social Sciences
- ECB (disambiguation)
  - (i) England (and Wales) Cricket Board
  - European Central Bank
- ECBR – (i) European Coalition for Biomedical Research
- ECCM (disambiguation) – (i) Electronic Counter-Counter-Measures
- ECDay – (a/i) Earth Constitution Day
- ECF – (i) Environmental Correction Factor
- ECFS (disambiguation) – (i) Electronic Case Filing System
- ECG – (i) Electrocardiogram
- Echo (disambiguation)
  - (a) Each Community Helps Others (EPA programme)
  - Educational Concerns for Hunger Organization
  - European Commission Host Organization
  - European Commission Humanitarian aid Office
  - (p) Exchange Clearing House
  - Expanded Characteristic Option
  - (a) Explanatory Coherence by Harmony Optimization
- ECHR
  - (i) European Convention on Human Rights
  - (i) European Court of Human Rights
- ECJ – (i) European Court of Justice
- ECL – (i) Emitter Coupled Logic (electronics)
- ECM
  - (i) Electronic Counter-Measures
  - Enterprise Content Management
- ECommHR – (p) European Commission on Human Rights
- ECOWAS - (a) Economic Community of West African States
- ECS
  - (i) Emergency Contact System
  - Enhanced Chip Set (computing)
  - EOSDIS Core System
  - Extended Chip Set (computing)
- ECSC – (i) European Coal and Steel Community (distant ancestor of the EU)
- ECT – (i) ElectroConvulsive Therapy
- ECtHR – (p) European Court of Human Rights
- ECU
  - (s) Ecuador (ISO 3166 trigram)
  - (i) European Currency Unit (ancestor of the euro)
- ECW
  - (i) Eastern Championship Wrestling/Extreme Championship Wrestling

== ED ==
- EDA – (i) European Defence Agency
- EDAC – (a) Error Detection And Correction
- EDC - (a) Everyday carry
- EDC-DAAC – (i) EROS Data Center Distributed Active Archive Center
- EDCS – (i) Environmental Data Coding Specification
- EDD
  - (i) Earliest due date
  - Electron-detachment dissociation
  - Elena Delle Donne (American basketball player)
  - Employment Development Department (California state agency)
  - End-diastolic dimension
  - Expected date of delivery (pregnancy)
- EDECSIM – (p) Extended Directed Energy Combat Simulation
- EDF or EdF – (i) Électricité de France (French, "France Electricity", a utility company)
- EDGAR – (a) Electronic Data Gathering, Analysis, and Retrieval (U.S. Securities and Exchange Commission filings database)
- EDH – (i) Eastman Dental Hospital
- EDS
  - (i) Electronic Data Systems
  - Electronic Differential System
- EDSA – (a) Epifanio de los Santos Avenue (a major thoroughfare in Manila with great significance to post-1980 Philippines history)
- EDT – (i) Eastern Daylight Saving Time (UTC−4 hours)
- EDTA
  - (i) Electric Drive Transportation Association
  - (p) EthyleneDiamineTetraAcetic acid

== EE ==
- ee – (s) Ewe language (ISO 639-1 code)
- EE
  - (s) Estonia (ISO 3166 digram; from the country's native name of Eesti)
  - (i) Electrical engineering
  - Electrical engineer
- E&E – (i) Escape and Evasion (training)
- EEC – (i) European Economic Community (predecessor of the EU)
- EEG – (i) Electroencephalogram
- EEK – (s) Estonian kroon (ISO 4217 currency code)
- EENT – (i) End Evening Nautical Twilight
- EEO – (i) Equal Employment Opportunity
- EEOC – (i) (U.S.) Equal Employment Opportunity Commission
- EEZ – (i) Economic exclusion zone or Exclusive economic zone

== EF ==
- EF
  - (i) Electro-focus (Canon lens mount)
  - Entry Foyer
  - (s) Exafarad
- EFF – (i) Electronic Frontier Foundation
- EFL
  - (i) English Football League
  - English as a Foreign Language
- EFM – (i) Enterprise Feedback Management
- EFOA – (i) European Fuel Oxygenates Association
- EFSA – (i) European Food Safety Authority
- EFT – (i) Electronic Fund Transfer
- EFTA
  - (i) European Free Trade Area
  - (i) European Free Trade Association
- EFV – (i) Expeditionary Fighting Vehicle

== EG ==
- e.g. – (i) exempli gratia (Latin, roughly "for the sake of an example", "for example", "for instance")
- EG – (s) Egypt (ISO 3166 digram; FIPS 10-4 country code)
- EGBUS – (i) External Genitalia, Bartholin's glands, Urethra & Skene's glands
- EGCG – (p) EpiGalloCatechin-3-Gallate
- EGIS – (a) Erieye Ground Interface Segment
- EGP – (s) Egyptian pound (ISO 4217 currency code)
- EGRET – (a) Energetic Gamma-Ray Experiment Telescope
- EGY – (s) Egypt (ISO 3166 trigram)

== EH ==
- EH
  - (s) Exahenry
  - (s) Western Sahara (ISO 3166 digram)
- EHA
  - (p) Education for All Handicapped Children Act (U.S. federal legislation; since superseded by the Individuals with Disabilities Education Act)
  - (i) Emotional Health Anonymous
- EHF – (i) Extremely High Frequency
- EHR – (i) Equipment History Record

== EI ==
- Ei – (s) Exbi
- EI – (s) Ireland (FIPS 10-4 country code; from Éire)
- EIA – (i) Environmental impact assessment
- EIAH – Environnements Informatiques pour l'Apprentissage Humain
- EIAH – Encyclopedia of Iranian Architectural History
- EIC – East India Company
- EICS – East India Company's Service
- eID – electronic ID
- EIRP – (i) Effective Isotropic Radiated Power
- EIS – (i) Environmental Impact Statement

== EJ ==
- EJ – (s) Exajoule

== EK ==
- EK – (s) Equatorial Guinea (FIPS 10-4 country code) – Exakelvin
- EKG – (i) Electrocardiogram (from German Elektrokardiogramm)
- EKMS – (i) Electronic Key Management System

== EL ==
- el – (s) Greek language (ISO 639-1 code)
- EL – (s) Exalitre
- ELF
  - (a/i) Earth Liberation Front
  - Endangered Language Fund
  - Eritrean Liberation Front
  - Executable and Linkable Format
  - Extremely Low Frequency
- ELINT – (p) Electronic Intelligence
- ell – (s) Greek language (ISO 639-2 code)
- ELL – (i) English Language Learner
- ELM – (i) Edge-Localised Mode (plasma physics)
- ELO – (i) Electric Light Orchestra
- ELP
  - (i) Emerson, Lake & Palmer
  - European Left Party
- ELSS – (i) Emergency Life Support Stores
- ELT – (i) Emergency Locator Transmitter

== EM ==
- Em – (s) Exametre
- EM – (i) ElectroMagnetism/ElectroMagnetic
- EMA – (i/a) European Medicines Agency
- Embraer – (p) Empresa Brasileira de Aeronáutica (Portuguese, "Brazilian Aeronautics Company")
- EMC
  - (i) Electric Membership Corporation
  - Electromagnetic Compatibility
  - Electro-Motive Corporation
  - European Muon Collaboration
  - Evergreen Marine Corporation
- EMCON – (p) (Electromagnetic) Emissions Control
- EMD
  - (i) General Motors Electro-Motive Division
  - Engineering and Manufacturing Development
  - European Missile Defence
- EMDEX – (a) Essential Medicines InDEX
- EMDG – (i) Euro-Missile Dynamics Group
- EMDR – (i) Eye Movement Desensitisation and Reprocessing
- EMEA – (i) Europe, Middle East and Africa
- EMF
  - (i) Electromotive force
  - Epsom Mad Funkers (1990s–2000s indie dance band)
- EMG – (p) ElectroMyoGraph
- EMO – (i) Emergency Measures Organisation- (p) Emotional
- EMP – (i) ElectroMagnetic Pulse
- EMR - (i) East Midlands Railway and European Metal Recycling
- EMS – (i) Emergency Medical Services
- EMT – (i) Emergency Medical Technician and East Midlands Trains
- EMU – (i) Electric Multiple Unit – a method of connecting self-propelled railway vehicles together to form a train under the control of one driver.
- EMV – (i) Europay, MasterCard, Visa (the companies that developed the current technical standard for chipped payment cards and contactless cards)

== EN ==
- en – (s) English language (ISO 639-1 code)
- EN
  - (p) Corps of Engineers
  - (s) Estonia (FIPS 10-4 country code)
  - Exanewton
- ENCODE – (p) Encyclopedia of DNA Elements (human genome data project)
- ENE – (i) East North-East
- eng – (s) English language (ISO 639-2 code)
- ENG – (s) England (FIFA trigram; not eligible for an ISO 3166 or IOC trigram)
- ENSATT – (i) École nationale supérieure des arts et techniques de théâtre (French, "Higher National School of Theatrical Arts and Techniques")
- ENT – (i) Ear, Nose and Throat
- ENTEC – (a) Euro NATO Training Engineer Centre
- ENVL – (a) Envelope
- ENY – (p) Enemy

== EO ==
- eo – (s) Esperanto language (ISO 639-1 code)
- EO
  - (i) Electro-Optics
  - Engagement Operations
- EOD – (i) Explosive Ordnance Disposal
- E&OE – (i) Errors and Omissions Excepted
- EOG – (i) ElectroOculoGraphy
- EOS
  - (i) Earth Observation Satellite
  - (a/i) Electro-Optical System, Canon's autofocusing system for film and digital SLR cameras, as well as the company's mirrorless cameras
  - (i) Electrophoresis Operations in Space, a space manufacturing project of the McDonnell Douglas Astronautics Company
- EOSAT – (p) Earth Observation Satellite
- EOSDIS – (a/i) Earth Observation Satellite Data and Information System
- EOTS
  - (i) Electro-Optical Tactical Sensor
  - (a/i) Eye Of The Storm (World of Warcraft)
- EOM – (i) End of Message

== EP ==
- EP – (i) European Parliament
- EP – (i) Extended play
- EPA
  - (p) EicosaPentaenoic Acid
  - (i) Environmental Protection Agency
- EPCOT – (a) Experimental Prototype Community Of Tomorrow
- EPCR
  - (i) Endothelial protein C receptor
  - European Professional Club Rugby
- EPFL – (i) École polytechnique fédérale de Lausanne (French, "Lausanne Federal Institute of Technology")
- EPGS – (i) EOS Polar Ground Sites
- EPIRB – (a/i) Emergency Position Indicating Radio Beacon
- EPL – (i) English Premier League
- EPLRS – (a) Enhanced Position Location Reporting System ("ee-plarz")
- epo – (s) Esperanto language (ISO 639-2 code)
- EPO
  - (i) Ellinikí Podosferikí Omospondía (Greek Ελληνική Ποδοσφαιρική Ομοσπονδία, translated as "Hellenic Football Federation")
  - European Patent Organisation or its main organ, the European Patent Office
  - (p) Erythropoietin
- EPOS – (a) Electronic Point Of Sale
- EPPA – (i) Employee Polygraph Protection Act
- EPR – (i) European Pressurised [Nuclear] Reactor
  - Evaporator Pressure regulator
- EPW
  - (i) Earth Penetrator Weapon/Warhead
  - Economic and Political Weekly (Indian publication)
  - Enemy Prisoner of War

== EQ ==
- EQ – (i) Emotional Quotient
- EQG – (s) Equatorial Guinea (FIFA trigram, but not IOC or ISO 3166)

== ER ==
- Er – (s) Erbium
- ER
  - (i) Emergency Room
  - (s) Eritrea (ISO 3166 digram; FIPS 10-4 country code)
- ERA
  - (i) Earned run average
  - Engineering Research Associates
  - Equal Rights Amendment
  - English Racing Automobiles
  - European Railway Agency
  - (a) Explosive Reactive Armor (tank add-on armor)
- ERCIM – (a/i) European Research Consortium for Informatics and Mathematics
- ERI – (s) Eritrea (ISO 3166 trigram)
- ERLAWS – (a) Eastern Ruapehu Lahar Alarm and Warning System
- ERN – (s) Eritrean nakfa (ISO 4217 currency code)
- EROS – (a) Earth Resources Observation System
- ERP – (i) Engineer Regulating Point
- ERR – (p) Eesti Rahvusringhääling
- ERS – (i) Earth Resources Survey
- ERTS – (i) Earth Resources Technology Satellite (became Landsat)
- ERV – (p) Endogenous RetroVirus

== ES ==
- es – (s) Spanish language (ISO 639-1 code)
- Es
  - (s) Einsteinium
  - Exasecond
- ES
  - (s) El Salvador (FIPS 10-4 country code)
  - (i) Electronic-warfare support
  - (s) Exasiemens
  - Spain (ISO 3166 digram; from the country's native name of España)
- ESA
  - (i) Electro-Spark Alloying
  - Endangered Species Act
  - European Space Agency
- ESC
  - (i) Embryonic Stem Cell
  - Electronic Stability Control
- ESD – (i) ElectroStatic Discharge
- ESDP – (i) European Security and Defence Policy
- ESE – (i) East South-East
- ESH – (s) Western Sahara (ISO 3166 trigram)
- ESL – (i) English as a Second Language
- ESM – (i) Electronic warfare Support Measures
- ESO – (i) European Southern Observatory
- ESOL – English for Speakers of Other Languages
- ESP
  - (i) Electronic Stability Program
  - Extra-sensory perception
  - (s) Spain (ISO 3166 trigram)
- ESPGHAN - European Society for Paediatric Gastroenterology, Hepatology and Nutrition
- ESPN – (i) Entertainment and Sports Programming Network
- est – (s) Estonian language (ISO 639-2 code)
- EST
  - (i) Eastern Standard Time (UTC−5 hours)
  - (s) Estonia (ISO 3166 trigram)
- ESU – (i) Emergency service unit
- ESV – (i) Engineer Support Vehicle

== ET ==
- et – (s) Estonian language (ISO 639-1 code)
- ET
  - (s) Ethiopia (ISO 3166 digram; FIPS 10-4 country code)
  - Exatesla
  - (i) Extra terrestrial
- ETA
  - (i) Estimated rime of arrival
  - (a) Euzkadi Ta Azkatasuna ("etta", Basque, "Basque Homeland and Freedom")
- et al. – (p) et alii/aliae/alia (Latin, "and others")
- ETB – (s) Ethiopian Birr (ISO 4217 currency code)
- ETC/RMT – (i) Explosive Transient Camera/Rapidly Moving Telescope
- Etc. - Et cetera
- ETF – (i) Emergency Task Force (a special police unit, also jocularly said to stand for Extra-Thick Fuzz)
- ETH – (s) Ethiopia (ISO 3166 trigram)
- ETI – (i) Extra-terrestrial intelligence
- ETK
  - (i) Easy tool kit
  - (i) Embedded tool kit
  - Ersatzteikatalog (German: spare parts catalog)
- ETLA – (i) Extended TLA
- ETM
  - (i) Electronic technical manual
  - (i) Enhanced Thematic Mapper
- ETOPS - (a) Extended-range Twin-engine Operational Performance Standards (aviation)
- et seq. – (p) et sequens/sequentes/sequentia (Latin, "and the following one(s)")
- ETT – (i) Embedded Training Team

== EU ==
- eu – (s) Basque language (ISO 639-1 code)
- Eu – (s) Europium
- EU
  - (s) Europa Island (FIPS 10-4 country code)
  - (i) European Union
- EUCOM – (p) (U.S.) European Command
- EULA – (a) End-user license agreement ("you-lah")
- EUR – (s) euro (ISO 4217 currency code)
- eus – (s) Basque language (ISO 639-2 code)
- EUUSA – (s) European Union and United States of America

== EV ==
- EV – (s) Exavolt
- EVA
  - (i) Earned value analysis
  - Economic value added
  - Ethylene-Vinyl Acetate
  - Extra-vehicular activity
- EVIL – (a) Electronic viewfinder (with) interchangeable lens (a type of digital camera)

== EW ==
- EW – (i) Electronic warfare – (s) Exawatt
- ewe – (s) Ewe language (ISO 639-2 code)
- EWR – (s) Newark Liberty International Airport (IATA airport code)
- EWSD – (p) Elektronisches Wählsystem Digital (German, "Electronic Digital Switching System")
- EWTN – (i) Eternal Word Television Network

== EX ==
- EXFOR – (p) Experimental force (military)
- EXREP – (p) Expeditious Repair (SM&R code)

== EY ==
- EYD
  - Ejaan Yang Disempurnakan (Indonesian, "Perfected Spelling System", used officially in Indonesia since 1972)
  - Eurovision Young Dancers

== EZ ==
- EZ – (s) Czech Republic (FIPS 10-4 country code) – (i) Extraction zone
- EZLN – (a) Ejército Zapatista de Liberación Nacional (Spanish, "Zapatista Army of National Liberation")
