= EECS =

EECS may refer to:

- Electrical engineering and computer science
  - Electrical engineering
  - Computer science
- European Energy Certificate System

== See also ==
- EEC (disambiguation)
