= Easa (surname) =

Easa or Al-Easa is a last name shared by the following people:

- Ahmed Easa (born 1985), Maldivian film actor
- Ismail Easa (born 1989), Maldivian association football player
- Hamad Al-Easa (born 1972), Kuwaiti association football player

== See also ==
- EASA (disambiguation)
