= Lars-Erik Cederman =

Swiss-Swedish political scientist

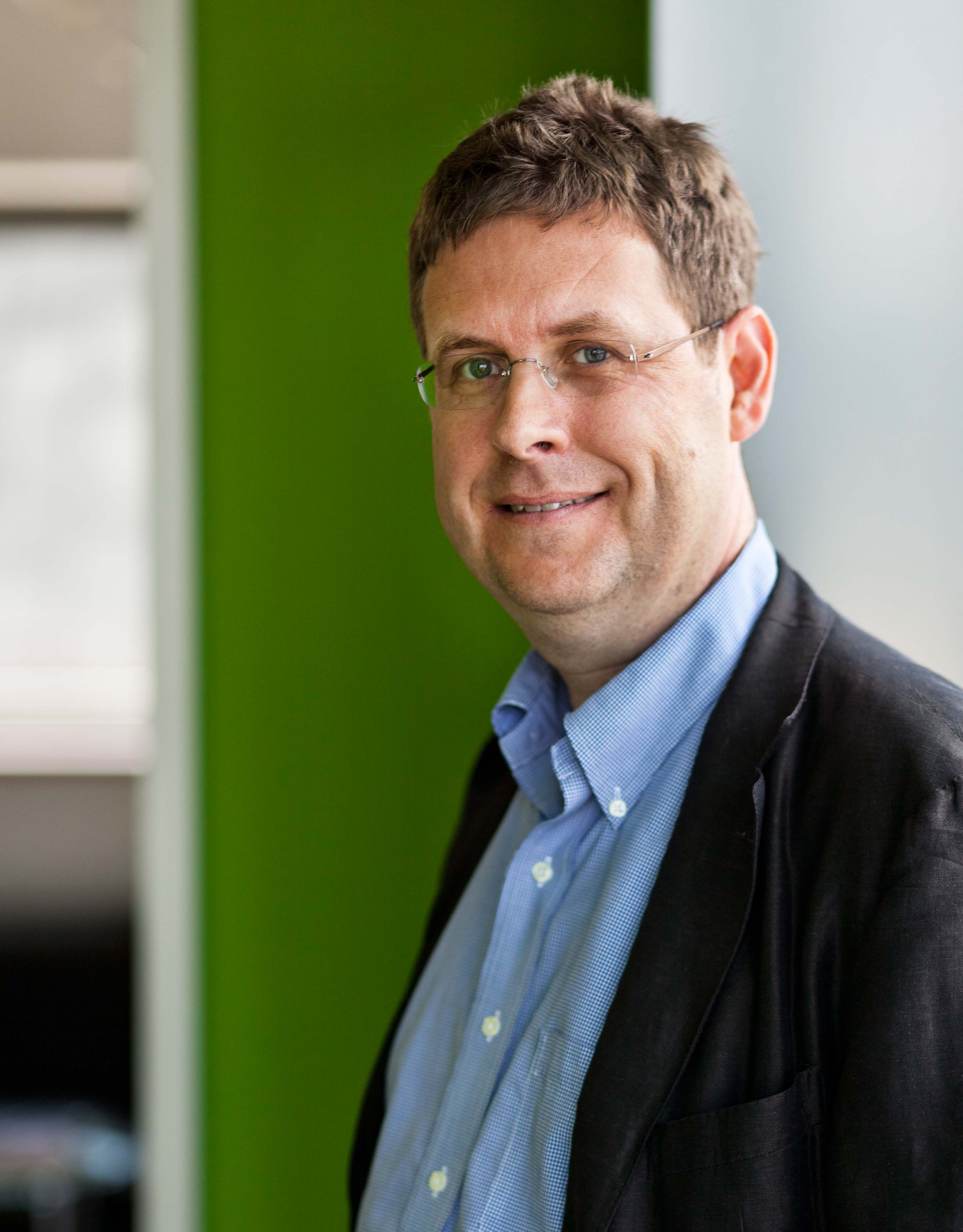
- Born: 27 May 1963 in Storfors, Sweden
- Awards: Marcel Benoist Prize

Academic background
- Education: The University of Michigan at Ann Arbor, United States, Graduate Institute of International Studies

Academic work
- Discipline: Political Science, Peace and Conflict Studies
- Institutions: ETH Zurich
- Website: https://icr.ethz.ch/people/cederman/

Lars-Erik Cederman (born 1963) is a Swiss-Swedish political scientist and professor of International Conflict Research at ETH Zurich. His main fields of research are ethnic inequality and conflict, power-sharing, state formation and nationalism.

== Biography ==
Cederman received an M.Sc. in engineering physics from the University of Uppsala in 1988 and an M.A. in International Relations from the Graduate Institute of International Studies in Geneva in 1990, before obtaining his Ph.D. in political science from the University of Michigan in 1994. He held academic positions at the University of Michigan, the Graduate Institute of International Studies in Geneva, the Somerville College, Oxford, UCLA, and Harvard University. He became professor at ETH Zurich in 2003.

He was the director of the Center for Comparative and International Studies (CIS), and a co-founder of the ETH Risk Center and the Competence Center for "Coping with Crises in Socio-Economic Systems." Cederman also led the European Network of Conflict Research (ENCoRe), a Horizon 2020 program that brought together researchers and policy makers for the purpose of analysing and predicting the outbreak and trajectories of conflict processes around the world.

== Awards ==
In 1998, Cederman received the Edgar S. Furniss Award for his monograph “Emergent Actors in World Politics: How States and Nations Develop and Dissolve”. This book is based on his dissertation work, for which he received the Horace H. Rackham Distinguished Dissertation Award from the University of Michigan in 1995. The book “Inequality, Grievances, and Civil War”, which was published by Cederman together with Kristian Skrede Gleditsch and Halvard Buhaug in 2013 with Cambridge University Press, won four prizes, including the International Studies Association Best Book Award, the American Political Science Association Conflict Processes Best Book Award, the Conflict Research Society Book of the Year Award (co-winner) and the Network of European Peace Scientists Medal for the best publication in peace sciences.

Cederman was twice granted the Heinz Eulau Award for the best article in the American Political Science Review in 2011 for the co-authored article “Horizontal Inequalities and Ethno-Nationalist Civil War: A Global Comparison”, and in 2001 for the article “Back to Kant: Reinterpreting the Democratic Peace as a Collective Learning Process.”

The GROWup Project, which serves as the main outlet for data generated by Cederman's research group, was honoured as the “best data contribution to the study of any and all forms of political conflict” by the American Political Science Association, which awarded it with the J. David Singer Data Innovation Award in 2015.

In 2018, Cederman was awarded the Marcel Benoist Swiss Science Prize for his work on political peace-building and the inclusion of ethnic minorities.

In 2019 he became a member of the German Academy of Sciences Leopoldina.

== Grants ==
Cederman was and is the principal investigator in several research projects with funding from the Swiss National Science Foundation and the Swiss Network for International Studies. In 2018, he was also awarded a European Research Council (ERC) advanced grant of 2.5 million euro for a research project on nationalist state transformation and conflict.

== Data ==
Since 2003, Cederman and his research group have been collecting evidence on ethnic groups and their participation in conflict processes. Going beyond analysing data at the country-level, the effort has concentrated on disaggregating the unit under study, overcoming some of the inherent limitations by obtaining revealing information at different levels of aggregation. This immense data collection undertaking culminated in the widely used Ethnic Power Relations (EPR) Dataset Family. This identifies all politically relevant ethnic groups and their level of access to state power for all countries in the world from 1946 to 2017, as well as provides geo-spatial information through polygons that describe the location of these groups on a digital map, their involvement in conflicts, their linguistic, religious and racial cleavages, and their presence in refugee flows. Using advanced technologies such as satellite imaging (e.g. topography, emission of light at night as a proxy for economic development, etc.) and interlinking their own data with other datasets, Cederman's research group has derived new and critical statistical information at the country, administrative division, and ethnic group levels. The resulting information and indicators are made accessible in a user-friendly manner via the GROWup - Geographical Research On War, Unified Platform.

== Selected bibliography ==
- Cederman, Lars-Erik. 1997. Emergent Actors in World Politics: How States and Nations Develop and Dissolve. Princeton, NJ: Princeton University Press.
- Cederman, Lars-Erik. 2001. “Back to Kant: Reinterpreting the Democratic Peace as a Macrohistorical Learning Process.” American Political Science Review 95(1): 15.
- Cederman, Lars-Erik, Kristian Skrede Gleditsch, and Halvard Buhaug. 2013. Inequality, Grievances, and Civil War. New York, NY: Cambridge University Press.
- Cederman, Lars-Erik, Nils B. Weidmann, and Kristian Skrede Gleditsch. 2011. “Horizontal Inequalities and Ethnonationalist Civil War: A Global Comparison.” American Political Science Review 105(3): 478–95.
