= ETK =

ETK may refer to:

- ETK, a fictional car brand from BeamNG.drive mainly based on BMW
- Commune of the Working People of Estonia (Estonian: Eesti Töörahva Kommuun)
- Edakkad railway station, in Kerala, India
- EPH receptor A3, a protein
- Erythrocyte transketolase, i.e. transketolase found in red blood cells (cf. Transketolase#Diagnostic_use)
- ETK v News Group Newspapers Ltd, a legal injunction in the United Kingdom
