= EDTA (disambiguation) =

EDTA is ethylenediaminetetraacetic acid (and ethylenediaminetetraacetate), a chemical compound

EDTA may also refer to:

- Electric Drive Transportation Association (EDTA)
- Epstein-Dumas Test of Adultness, an assessment of one's ability to perform in an "adult" capacity in various facets of life.
- European Dialysis and Transplant Association (EDTA)
- Educational Theatre Association (EdTA)

== See also ==
- ETDA
