= ECSC =

ECSC may stand for:

- European Coal and Steel Community, a forerunner of the European Union
- Eastern Colleges Science Conference, an undergraduate research conference in the northeastern United States
- Eastern Caribbean Supreme Court, a Caribbean court system established under the Organisation of Eastern Caribbean States
- East Coast Surfing Championships, one of the United States Surfing Federation's major amateur events
- Expedia CruiseShipCenters
- European Cybersecurity Challenge, a CTF competition at a European level
