= ETB =

ETB may refer to:

== Technology ==
- ETB (company), a Colombian telecommunications company
- Electric trolley bus
- Electronic throttle body, in vehicles
- End-of-Transmission-Block character, in computing
- Engineering and Technology Board, now EngineeringUK, a UK organisation that promotes engineering
- Ethernet Train Backbone, a train communication network

== Other uses ==
- Education and Training Board, a public body in Ireland
- Elite Trainer Box, a booster box for the Pokémon trading card came
- Endothelin B receptor, a protein
- Equitorial Trust Bank, a Nigerian commercial bank
- Etebi language of Nigeria
- Ethiopian birr, the currency of Ethiopia
- Euskal Telebista, a television network in the Basque Autonomous Community
