= Lists of acronyms =

Lists of acronyms contain acronyms, a type of abbreviation formed from the initial components of the words of a longer name or phrase. They are organized alphabetically and by field.

== Alphabetical ==
- List of acronyms: 0–9
- List of acronyms: A
- List of acronyms: B
- List of acronyms: C
- List of acronyms: D
- List of acronyms: E
- List of acronyms: F
- List of acronyms: G
- List of acronyms: H
- List of acronyms: I
- List of acronyms: J
- List of acronyms: K
- List of acronyms: L
- List of acronyms: M
- List of acronyms: N
- List of acronyms: O
- List of acronyms: P
- List of acronyms: Q
- List of acronyms: R
- List of acronyms: S
- List of acronyms: T
- List of acronyms: U
- List of acronyms: V
- List of acronyms: W
- List of acronyms: X
- List of acronyms: Y
- List of acronyms: Z

== By topic ==
- Acronyms and abbreviations in avionics
- List of Aramaic acronyms
- List of astronomy acronyms
- Climate change acronyms
- List of computer science conference acronyms
- List of acronyms associated with the eurozone crisis
- List of government and military acronyms
- Acronyms in healthcare
- List of information technology initialisms
- Laser acronyms
- List of abbreviations in oil and gas exploration and production
- List of geographic acronyms and initialisms
- List of LGBT-related acronyms
- List of rabbis known by acronyms
- List of U.S. government and military acronyms
- List of waste management acronyms

== See also ==
- Lists of abbreviations
- List of portmanteaus
