= EN =

EN, En, or en may refer to:

== Businesses ==
- Air Dolomiti, Italian regional airline (IATA code EN)
- Bouygues (stock symbol EN)
- Island Rail Corridor, formerly known as the Esquimalt and Nanaimo Railway (reporting mark EN)
- Euronews, a news television and internet channel

== Language and writing ==
- N, 14th letter of the Roman alphabet
- EN (cuneiform), a mark in Sumerian cuneiform script for a High priest or Priestess (meaning "lord", or "priest")
- En (digraph) /‹en›/, a phoneme
- En (Cyrillic), 15th letter of the Cyrillic alphabet
- En (typography), a unit of typographical width
  - Dash#En dash /en dash/, a dash of length 1 en
- En language, a language spoken in northern Vietnam
- English language (ISO 639-1 language code: en)

== Organisations ==
- Eastern National, a US organization providing educational products to National Park visitors
- English Nature, a former UK government conservation agency
- Envirolink Northwest, an environmental organization in England

== Science and technology ==
- Early Neolithic, an archaeological period
- Engineer
- E_{n} (Lie algebra), a family of E_{n} Lie algebras, unique for 70n=5..8
- Electroless nickel plating, a chemical technique
- Electronegativity, chemical tendency to attract electrons
- Engrailed (gene), involved in early embryological development
- Erythema nodosum, an inflammation of the fat cells under the skin
- Ethylenediamine, C_{2}H_{8}N_{2}, an organic compound
- European Norm or European Standard
- Exanewton (EN), an SI unit of force: 10^{18} newtons
- Endangered species, a conservation status level

== Other uses ==
- En (deity), in Albanian mythology
- EuroNight, the European night train designation
- Yen, Japanese currency unit, pronounced en
- Empty net goal in ice hockey
- Enrolled Nurse, an Australian term for a licensed practical nurse
- En Esch (born 1968), stage name for German musician Nicklaus Schandelmaier
- "EN", a song by Arca
- Estrada Nacional, a National Highway in Portugal or Angola
