= ECL =

ECL may refer to:

== Science and technology ==
- Electrochemiluminescence
- Enhanced chemiluminescence
- Emitter-coupled logic
- Enterochromaffin-like cell

=== Computing ===
- ECL programming language, an extensible programming language
- ECL (data-centric programming language)
- Embeddable Common Lisp

== Sport ==
- East Cornwall League, an English football league
- Eastern Colored League, a defunct American baseball league
- Eastern Counties Football League, in England
- European Cricket League, a professional cricket league organized by ICC member federations
- UEFA Europa Conference League, annual football club competition organised by UEFA
- European Champions League (table tennis), annual table tennis club competition
- Entertainers Cricket League (Cricket), an Indian cricket league organized by social media celebrities

== Other uses ==
- Eccleston Park railway station, in England
- Ecolab, a sanitation supply company
- École centrale de Lyon, a graduate engineering school in Lyon, France
- Educational Community License, a software license
- Exit Control List, system of border control maintained by the Government of Pakistan
- Extended collective licensing, collective copyright and related rights laws and licensing agreement
