= EMP =

EMP or Emp may refer to:

== Science and technology ==
- Electromagnetic propulsion
- Electromagnetic pulse
  - and in particular, Nuclear electromagnetic pulse
- Electron microprobe
- Embden–Meyerhof pathway
- Estramustine phosphate
- Extended Mathematical Programming
- EMP1, a protein that in humans is encoded by the EMP1 gene
- EMP2, a protein that in humans is encoded by the EMP2 gene

=== Firearms ===
- EMP 44, a prototype, all-metal submachine gun produced by Erma Werke in 1943
- Erma EMP, a German submachine gun manufactured during the 1930s
- Springfield Armory EMP, an American semi-automatic pistol

== Businesses ==
- EMP Merchandising, a German company
- EMP Label Group, a record company
- Ericsson Mobile Platforms, a defunct telecommunications company
- Eleven Madison Park, a high-end restaurant in New York
- Equipment Management Pool (EMP), an intermodal container service co-run by the Union Pacific Railroad and Norfolk Southern Railway

== Popular culture ==
- Lord Emp, a character in the series Wildcats
- Empowered, the title character of the Empowered graphic novel series

== Transport ==
- EMP, National Rail station code for Emerson Park railway station, London
- EMP, FAA location identifier of Emporia Municipal Airport, Kansas

== Other uses ==
- 5001 EMP, a minor planet
- "Emp", nickname of David Peacock (American football) (1890–?), American college football player and coach and politician
- EMP Museum, now the Museum of Pop Culture, in Seattle, Washington
- Estado Mayor Presidencial, the former Mexican presidential guard
- emp, the ISO 639-3 code for the Northern Embera language
- Energy Modelling Platform, a European policy analysis initiative supported by the Horizon 2020 science funding program
- Efficient Modular Platform 2 (EMP2), a car platform developed by PSA Group
- Early Modern Period, the time period following the Middle Ages and ending at the late-1700s
