= EIA =

Eia or EIA may refer to:

== Medicine ==
- Enzyme immunoassay
- Equine infectious anemia
- Exercise-induced anaphylaxis
- Exercise-induced asthma
- External iliac artery

== Transport ==
- Edmonton International Airport, in Alberta, Canada
- Erbil International Airport, in Kurdistan Region, Iraq
- Evergreen International Airlines, an American airline

== Other uses ==
- Early Iron Age, an archaeological period
- Economic Integration Agreement
- Eia, a former Medieval manor that is now part of Central London
- Electronic Industries Alliance, formerly Electronic Industries Association, an American trade organization
  - EIA standards
- Emerging issues analysis
- Emirates Investment Authority
- Energy Information Administration of the United States Department of Energy
- Environmental impact assessment
- Environmental Investigation Agency, a British environmental organisation
- Equity-indexed annuity
- European Inventor Award, awarded annually by the European Patent Office
- International Anticommunist Entente (French: Entente Internationale Anticommuniste)

== People with the surname ==
- Harald Eia (born 1966), Norwegian comedian
- Magnhild Eia (born 1960), Norwegian politician
