= ETI =

ETI may refer to:

== Organizations ==
- Ecobank Transnational Inc., a pan-African banking conglomerate
- Electric Transit, Inc., a defunct American trolleybus manufacturer
- Electronic Temperature Instruments, a British instrumentation manufacturer
- Elemental Technologies, Inc., an American video software company
- Energy Technologies Institute, a British energy research institute
- Ente Tabacchi Italiani, an Italian tobacco company
- Equipment and Tool Institute, an American automotive trade association
- Ethical Trading Initiative, a British membership organisation promoting ethical supply-chain management
- Eti (company), a Turkish food company
- Eti Maden, a Turkish mining and chemicals company

== People ==
- Eti Livni (born 1948), Israeli politician
- Eti Saaga (1950–2017), American Samoan writer
- Eti Tavares (born 1993), Bissau-Guinean footballer

== Science ==
- Ethyl iodide
- Effector-triggered immunity
- Extraterrestrial intelligence

== Other uses ==
- Eti (film), a 2008 Indian Bengali-language film
- Eti River, Sarem Island, Indonesia
- Electronics Today International, a defunct magazine
- "E.T.I. (Extra Terrestrial Intelligence)", a song by Blue Öyster Cult from their 1976 album Agents of Fortune
