= Ehala =

Estonian feminine given name and family name

Origin
- Languages: Estonian, from Proto-Finnic
- Meaning: "twilight place"
- Region of origin: Estonia

Other names
- Related names: Eha

Ehala is an Estonian surname, and less commonly, a feminine given name meaning "twilight place"; a compound of eha (twilight, dusk) and -la (noun-forming suffix that signifies a place).

As of 1 January 2026, 82 men and 83 women in Estonia have the surname Ehala. Ehala is ranked as the 1072nd most common surname for men in Estonia, and 1187th for women. The surname Ehala is most common in Viljandi County, where 6.08 per 10,000 inhabitants of the county bear the surname.

Notable people bearing the surname Ehala include:

- Katrin Ehala (1953–2024), Estonian singer and music educator
- Martin Ehala (born 1963), Estonian linguist and sociolinguist
- Olav Ehala (born 1950), Estonian composer
