= EPR =

EPR may refer to:

== Science and technology ==
- EPR (nuclear reactor), European Pressurised-Water Reactor
- EPR paradox (Einstein–Podolsky–Rosen paradox), in physics
- Earth potential rise, in electrical engineering
- East Pacific Rise, a mid-oceanic ridge
- Electron paramagnetic resonance
- Engine pressure ratio, of a jet engine
- Ethylene propylene rubber
- Yevpatoria RT-70 radio telescope (Evpatoria planetary radar)
- Bernays–Schönfinkel class or effectively propositional (EPR), in mathematical logic
- Endpoint references in Web addressing
- Ethnic power relations, dataset of ethnic groups
- ePrivacy Regulation (ePR), proposal for the regulation of various privacy-related topics, mostly in relation to electronic communications within the European Union

== Medicine ==
- Enhanced permeability and retention effect, a controversial concept in cancer research
- Emergency Preservation and Resuscitation, a medical procedure
- Electronic patient record

== Environment ==
- UNECE Environmental Performance Reviews, of environmental policies
- Environmental pricing reform
- Extended producer responsibility for environmental costs
- Enhanced performance round, a lead-free "Green bullet"

== Organisations ==
- EPR Architects, London, UK
- European Platform for Rehabilitation
- Popular Revolutionary Army (Spanish: Ejército Popular Revolucionario), a guerrilla movement in Mexico
- Popular Regular Army (Spanish: Ejército Popular Regular), Spain, 1936
- East Pakistan Rifles, later Border Guards Bangladesh
- Energy Power Resources, operator of Glanford Power Station
- Together for the Republic, a political party of the Democratic Republic of Congo

== Other uses ==
- Employment-to-population ratio, an economic statistic
- Enlisted Performance Report, USAF evaluation form
- Enhanced performance round, i.e. of the 5.56×45mm NATO
- Esperance Airport, Australia, IATA code
- Prabhadevi railway station, India, station code
- Evaluative Proportional Representation electoral systems
