= ETT =

Ett or ETT may refer to:

== Arts ==
- Caspar Ett (1788–1847), German composer and organist
- English Touring Theatre

== Mathematics ==
- Euler tour technique, in graph theory
- Extensional type theory, in logic

== Medicine ==
- Endotracheal tube, in respiratory medicine
- Epithelioid trophoblastic tumour, a very rare cancer
- Ergothioneine transporter, a protein and human gene (SLC22A4)
- Exercise Tolerance Test, in cardiology

== Military ==
- Embedded Training Teams in Afghanistan
- EBR ETT, a French armoured personnel carrier

== Other uses ==
- Elementary Teachers of Toronto, a Canadian labour union
- English Toy Terrier, a dog breed
- Etruscan language, once spoken in Italy (ISO 639-3: ett)
- European Transactions on Telecommunications, a scientific journal
- Evacuated Tube Transport
