= Ebo =

Ebo may refer to:

== People ==
- Ebo of Rheims (775–851), archbishop of Reims
- Ebo Andoh (born 1993), Ghanaian footballer
- Ebo Elder (born 1978), American boxer
- Ebo Taylor (1936–2026), Ghanaian guitarist, composer, bandleader and arranger
- Halim Ebo (born 1989), Egyptian volleyball player
- Ebo of Michelsberg (died 1163), German monk known for some writings
- Mary Antona Ebo, American civil rights activist, Catholic sister, and hospital administrator

== Places ==
- Ebo, Angola, a town and municipality
- Ebo, Missouri, an unincorporated community in Washington County
- Ebo Landing, site of a mass suicide by Igbo slaves in the United States
- Ebo Wildlife Reserve, Cameroon

== Other uses ==
- Ebo (spider), a spider genus
- Boo dialect of the Central Teke language
- Ebo Gospels, an early Carolingian illuminated Gospel book
- Ebon Airport, in the Marshall Islands
- Effects-based operations, a United States military concept
- Eisenbahn-Bau- und Betriebsordnung, a German law
- Elmshorn-Barmstedt-Oldesloe railway, in Germany
- European Board of Ophthalmology
- Hellenic Arms Industry (EBO), a Greek arms manufacturer
- Igbo people, an ethnic group of Nigeria
