= European Transactions on Telecommunications =

- Discipline: Telecommunications
- Language: English
- Edited by: Mischa Dohler

Publication details
- History: 1990-present
- Publisher: Wiley-Blackwell
- Frequency: 8/year
- Impact factor: 0.448 (2010)

Standard abbreviations
- ISO 4: Eur. Trans. Telecommun.

Indexing
- ISSN: 1124-318X (print); 1541-8251 (web)
- LCCN: 97648206
- OCLC no.: 35682302

Links
- Journal homepage; Online access; Online archive

European Transactions on Telecommunications is a peer-reviewed scientific journal covering all aspects of information technology and telecommunications.

== Abstracting and indexing ==
The journal is abstracted and indexed in the following databases:

- Cambridge Scientific Abstracts
- COMPENDEX)
- Computer and Information Systems Abstracts
- Advanced Polymer Abstracts
- Civil Engineering Abstracts
- Mechanical & Transportation Engineering Abstracts
- Current Contents/Engineering, Computing & Technology
- Engineered Materials Abstracts
- INSPEC
- METADEX
- Earthquake Engineering Abstracts
- PASCAL
- Science Citation Index Expanded

According to the Journal Citation Reports, the journal has a 2010 impact factor of 0.448, ranking it 55th out of 78 journals in the category "Telecommunications".
