= EFL =

EFL most commonly refers to English as a foreign language.

EFL may also refer to:

== Sports ==
- Eastern Football League (Australia), an Australian rules football league
- Eastern Football League (Scotland), a defunct Scottish football competition
- Elite Football League of India, an American football league in India, Sri Lanka and Bangladesh
- Empire Football League, a semi-pro American football league
- English Football League, an English football competition
- Enterprise Football League, a Taiwanese football league
- European Football League, a league of clubs affiliated with the European Federation of American Football

== Science and technology ==
- EFL (programming language)
- 35 mm equivalent focal length
- Effective focal length
- Enlightenment Foundation Libraries, a set of graphical software libraries

== Other uses ==
- Eagle Air (Tanzania), an airline
- Etron Fou Leloublan, a French avant-progressive rock band
- Kefalonia International Airport in Greece

== See also ==
- EFL Cup, an annual knockout association football competition in men's domestic English football (tier one to tier four)
- EFL Trophy, an annual English association football knock-out competition (tier three to tier four)
- Eastern Football League (disambiguation)
- Extreme Football League (disambiguation)
