= Eng =

Eng or ENG may refer to:

== Language and linguistics ==
- Eng (letter), Ŋ ŋ
- En with descender, Ң ң
- eng, ISO 639-3 and ISO 639-2 code for English language
- Velar nasal, a phoneme

== People ==
- Eng (name), a given name and surname in various cultures

== Places ==
- Eng Lake, in Minnesota, United States
- ENG, FIFA country code for England
- Eng, Netherlands, a hamlet in the municipality of Altena, North Brabant
- Eng, Tyrol, an exclave in Tyrol, Austria

== Other uses ==
- E.N.G., a Canadian television drama
- Electronic news-gathering
- Electronystagmography
- Empty net goal
- Endoglin, a protein
- Engineer
- Engineering
- Engineering notation
