= Eha (given name) =

Female given name

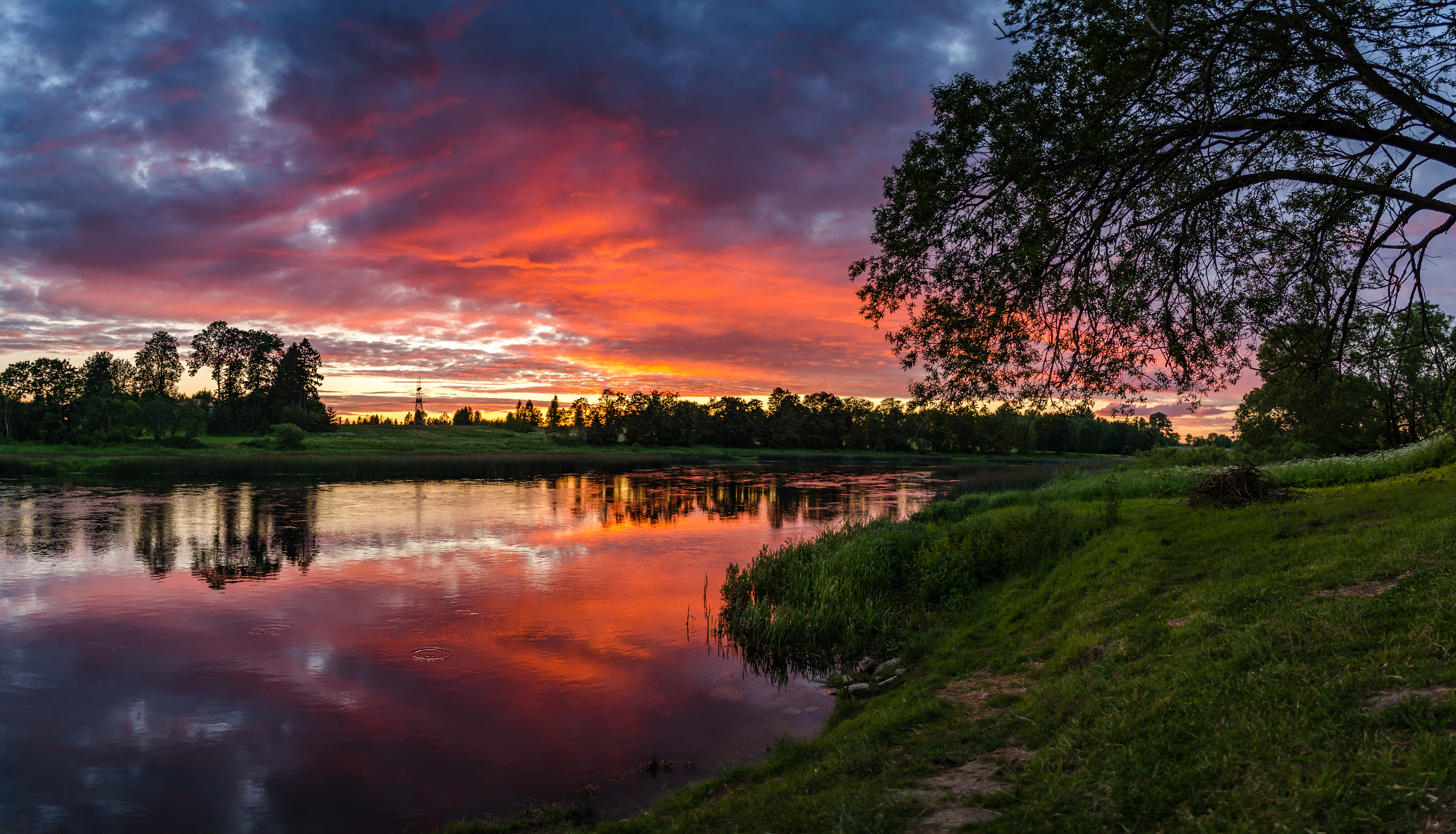
- Dusk at the Pärnu river
- Gender: Female
- Language: Estonian
- Name day: 1 July

Origin
- Origin: From eha
- Meaning: "dusk" and "twilight"
- Region of origin: Estonia

Other names
- Related names: Ehala

Eha is an Estonian feminine given name from the Estonian language word eha, meaning "dusk" and "twilight", and is occasionally a diminutive of the name Ehala.

As of 1 January 2021, 2,294 women in Estonia have the first name Eha, making it the 67th most popular female name in the country. The name is most commonly found in Jõgeva County, where 33.29 per 10,000 inhabitants of the county bear the name. Individuals bearing the name Eha include:

- Eha Lättemäe (1922–2012), poet and translator
- Eha Pärn (born 1957), municipal and civil servant
- Eha Rünne (born 1963), shot putter and discus thrower
