= EMT =

EMT or emt may refer to:

== Health and medicine ==
- Emergency medical technician, a professional that provides emergency medical services
- Epithelial–mesenchymal transition, a biological process in animal connective tissue
- Extraneuronal monoamine transporter, a protein-coding gene in the species Homo sapiens

== Science and technology ==
- Ecological modernization theory
- Electrical metallic tubing
- Error management theory
- Extended mind thesis

== Transportation ==
- East Midlands Trains, a former UK operator
- Empresa Municipal de Transportes de Madrid (EMT Madrid), public transport, Madrid, Spain
- San Gabriel Valley Airport, formerly El Monte Airport, a public airport 1 mile (1.6 km) north of El Monte, California; IATA airport code EMT

== Other uses ==
- E.M.T. (music group)
- Steve Emt (Stephen Emt) (born 1970), American wheelchair curler, 2018 Winter Paralympian
- Elektro-Mess-Technik (EMT), a German audio equipment manufacturer
- EMT (mobile operator), an Estonian mobile operator
- Epic Mickey 2: The Power of Two, a 2012 video game and the sequel to Disney's Epic Mickey
- European Master's in Translation
- Interac e-Transfer, formerly Interac Email Money Transfer or EMT, a funds transfer service in Canada
- Efficient-market theory, a hypothesis in financial economics
