= EMG =

EMG may refer to:

== Medicine and science ==
- Electromyography, a technique for evaluating and recording electrical activity produced by skeletal muscles
- Exponentially modified Gaussian distribution, in probability theory
- Ɱ, or emg, a symbol used to transcribe a specific sound in the International Phonetic Alphabet

== Organisations ==
- East Mediterranean Gas Company, an Egyptian pipeline company
- EMG, Inc., an American guitar pickup manufacturer
- E.M.G. Hand-Made Gramophones, a British gramophone manufacturer
- Escape Media Group, Inc., owner of Grooveshark
- Essential Media Group, former name of EQ Media Group
- Euclid Media Group, an American media company
- Executive Music Group, an American record label

== Other ==
- Eastern Mewahang language
- European Masters Games
