= EHF =

EHF may refer to:

== Science and technology ==
- Ebola hemorrhagic fever or Ebola virus disease, a disease of humans and other primates caused by ebolaviruses
- EHF (gene), ETS homologous factor, a human gene
- Extended Hunk Format, a version of the Amiga Hunk executable file format
- Extremely high frequency, a radio frequency band

== Organizations ==
- European Handball Federation, the European governing body for handball
- European Hockey Federation, an umbrella association for field hockey
- European Humanist Federation, an association of humanist organizations

== Other ==
- Einkahlutafélag (ehf.), a form of private company in Iceland
