= EI =

EI or Ei may refer to:

== Arts and media ==
- "E.I." (song), a single by Nelly
- E/I, a type of children's television programming shown in the United States
- Ei (album), an album by Maija Vilkkumaa
  - "Ei" (song), its first single
- Eerie, Indiana, an American television series
- Enrique Iglesias, Spanish pop music singer-songwriter
- Exposure index, the film speed rating of photographic film as exposed

== Businesses and organizations ==
- Aer Lingus (IATA code EI), the flag airline of Ireland
- The Earth Institute, a collection of research centers at Columbia University
- Education International, a global union federation of teachers' trade unions
- Elektronska Industrija Niš, electronics enterprise based in Niš, Serbia
- Energy Institute, the main professional organization for the energy industry within the UK
- Engineers Ireland, the professional body for engineers and engineering in Ireland
- Enterprise Ireland, is the Irish government organisation responsible for the development and growth of Irish enterprises in world markets.
- Expeditors International, the global logistics and freight forwarding company based out of Seattle, Washington
- The Electronic Intifada, an online publication covering the Israeli-Palestinian conflict from a Palestinian perspective

== Linguistics ==
- ⟨ei⟩, a digraph found in some Latin alphabets
- The original name of the Greek letter Epsilon
- ɛɪ in the International Phonetic Alphabet (IPA)

== Places ==
- Ei, Kagoshima, a town located in Ibusuki District, Kagoshima, Japan
- Emerald Isle, North Carolina, a town in Carteret County, North Carolina, United States

== Science, technology, and mathematics ==
- Ei (prefix symbol), the prefix abbreviation of the binary unit prefix "exbi"
- Earth Interactions, a scientific journal published by the American Meteorological Society, American Geophysical Union, and Association of American Geographers
- Ei Compendex, an engineering bibliographic database
- Electron ionization, an ionization method in which energetic electrons interact with gas phase atoms or molecules to produce ions
- Electronic ignition, a variety of modern ignition system
- Engineering Index, an article index for engineering journals
- Engineer intern, an intermediary step to becoming a Professional Engineer
- Environmental illness (multiple chemical sensitivity), a chronic medical condition characterized by symptoms that the affected person attributes to exposure to low levels of chemicals
- Ionization energy (E_{I}), the energy required to remove one electron from one atom to another
- Equine influenza, the disease caused by strains of Influenza A that are enzootic in horse species
- Exponential integral, a special function defined on the complex plane given the symbol Ei

== Other uses ==
- Education Index, a United Nations measure of the level of educational development in a country
- Ei (name), a Japanese and Burmese name
- Emotional intelligence, the ability to identify, assess, and control emotions
- Employment insurance, the unemployment benefits system of Canada
- Encyclopaedia of Islam, an encyclopaedia of the academic discipline of Islamic studies
- Enhanced interrogation, a euphemism for torture
- Ex infra, a Latin phrase meaning 'from below'
- Extreme ironing, an extreme sport and a performance art
- Esercito Italiano, Italian language for Italian Army
- Raiden Ei, the Electro Archon in 2020 video game Genshin Impact, who appears as the Raiden Shogun
- Republic of Ireland (aircraft registration prefix EI)
