= ECU =

ECU may refer to:

== Currencies ==
- European Currency Unit, precursor to the euro
- Écu, French coins of the 13th–19th centuries

== Technology ==
- Electronic control unit
- Engine control unit

== Universities ==
- East Carolina University, in Greenville, North Carolina, United States
- East Central University, in Ada, Oklahoma, United States
- Edith Cowan University, in Perth, Australia
- Emily Carr University of Art and Design, in Vancouver, Canada

== Other uses ==
- Eastman Credit Union, an American credit union
- ÉCU The European Independent Film Festival
- Ecuador, UNDP country code
- Eighth Creative Union of MEPhI, a Russian theatre company
- End Citizens United, a PAC working to get big money out of politics
- European Chess Union
- Evidence Control Unit
- Extensor carpi ulnaris muscle
- Extreme close-up
