= Epos =

Epos or EPOS may refer to:

== Science and technology ==
- Electronic point of sale, technology which enables an efficient recording of the sale of goods or services to the customer
- Embedded PowerPC Operating System, an IBM product
  - OpenEPOS, in the comparison of real-time operating systems

== Organisations ==
- Epos Ltd, a British loudspeaker manufacturer
- Epos (watch manufacturer)
- Emergency Physician Online Support, a group of physicians providing emergency medical services support
- EPOS Audio, based in Denmark, part of Demant

== Arts and entertainment ==
- "Epos", a song by Zedd on Clarity
- Elaine Paige on Sunday, a show on BBC Radio 2
- Epic poem or epos

== Other uses ==
- Mikoyan-Gurevich MiG-105, also known as EPOS, a proposed Russian spaceplane
- Epos (library ship), a floating library in Norway
- Evektor EPOS, an electric-powered airplane
- Husqvarna EPOS, a guidance system for robotic lawn mowers
