= EC2 =

EC2 or EC-2 may refer to:

- Amazon Elastic Compute Cloud (EC2), a commercial web service for hosting computer applications
- Cardoen EC-2 mine, an anti-personnel mine
- Cessna EC-2, a 1930s aircraft
- Kawasaki EC-2, an electronic-warfare variant of the Kawasaki C-2 military transport aircraft.
- EC2, a district in the London EC postcode area
- EC2-S-C1, U.S. World War II Liberty ships
- Escadre de Chasse 2, a flight of the French Air Force's Escadron de Chasse 01-002 "Cigognes"
- Eurocode 2, an alternative name for European reference norm EN 1992
- EC2 or ECII, a musical project produced by Mick Ronson
- Erg Chech 002, a meteorite
- EC2, a 2019 mixtape by Coi Leray
