= EHA =

Eha or EHA may refer to:

== Education ==
- East Haven Academy, in Connecticut
- East Holmes Academy, a closed segregation academy in West, Mississippi
- Economic History Association, an American academic research society
- Education for All Handicapped Children Act, of the United States Congress
- Epstein Hebrew Academy, in Olivette, Missouri

== People ==
- Eha (given name), an Estonian feminine given name
- Edward Hamilton Aitken (1851–1909), British naturalist and humorist
- Franz Eha (1907–1974), Swiss long distance runner

== Health ==
- European Hematology Association, a professional organisation
- EcoHealth Alliance A NGO for protecting health from infectious diseases

== Other uses ==
- East Hampton Aire, a defunct US airline
- Egg hatch assay
- Eha Railway, in China
- Electro-hydraulic actuator
- Elkhart–Morton County Airport, in Kansas, United States
- Engineering Heritage Awards
- England Handball Association
- English Hockey Association, now England Hockey
- Environmental Health Australia, a professional organisation
- Estonian Handball Association
- Ethernet Hardware Address
- EH Aalborg, Danish handball club
