= Extended collective licensing =

Type of licensing agreement

Extended collective licensing (ECL) are collective copyright and related rights laws and licensing agreements.

== ECL in the United Kingdom ==
The British Government introduced extended collective licensing into UK copyright law in 2013 as part of the Enterprise and Regulatory Reform Act. This was in part in recognition of the fact that collecting societies had for decades been offering licences that included the work of non-members. If a collecting society is granted the right by the government to operate an ECL non-members can receive individual remuneration (i.e. royalty payments) as if they were a full member of a collecting society. Unlike some Scandinavian countries, non-members are given the right to opt out from any ECLs offered. The UK has introduced a general and flexible right for collecting societies to operate extended collective licences for many different purposes, as long as they can prove what to the government they are sufficiently representative of the sector they operate in. This contrasts with Swedish and Czech law where there is only a list of specific uses to which licensing of this sort can be put.

== ECL in the Czech Republic ==
Extended collective licensing in the Czech Republic covers uses as wide as making available copyright works by libraries through to radio and television broadcasts.

== Examples ==
There are many examples of ECLs in operation, including

- Many television and radio broadcasts in Iceland, Sweden, Norway, Finland and Denmark.
- Many mass digitisations of in-copyright works by universities and libraries in Scandinavia are based on ECL. One example of this is the Bøkhylla project by the National Library of Norway which intends to digitise all books in the national library in Norwegian and make them available online.

== See also ==
- Voluntary collective licensing
