= EG =

Eg or EG may refer to:

== In arts and media ==
- E.G. (EP), an EP by Goodshirt
- EG (magazine), a journal dedicated to chess endgame studies
- Eg White (born 1966), a British musician, songwriter and producer
- E.G. Records, a music record label
- Electric Gardens, a music festival in Faversham, UK
- My Little Pony: Equestria Girls, an American toy line and media franchise by Hasbro

== Businesses and organizations ==
- EG Group, British operator of filling stations
- Enskilda Gymnasiet, a private secondary school in Stockholm, Sweden
- Eurographics, European Association for Computer Graphics
- Evil Geniuses, an electronic sports team
- Japan Asia Airways (IATA code EG)

== Places ==
- Egypt, a country in Northern Africa
- Eg, Afghanistan, a town
- Eg (Kristiansand), a neighbourhood in Kristiansand, Norway
- Eg River, a river in northern Mongolia
- Batshireet, a sum (district) in Mongolia, also known as Eg
- Equatorial Guinea, a small African country

== In science and technology ==
- .eg, Internet country code top-level domain for Egypt
- Envelope generator, used in synthesizers
- Ethylene glycol, an alcohol
- Exagram (Eg), an SI unit of mass
- Band gap energy, an energy range in a solid in which no electron states can exist

== Other uses ==
- e.g., abbreviation for exempli gratia, a Latin phrase meaning "for example"
- Evangelisches Gesangbuch, hymnal of many German language Protestant congregations
- EG, a model code for the 5th generation Honda Civic
- eingetragene Genossenschaft (eG), a registered cooperative society under German law

== See also ==
- Egg (disambiguation)
