= Ebe =

EBE or Ebe may refer to:

== Place ==
Ebe is a town in Udi local government of Enugu State, Nigeria.

== People ==
Given name

- Ebe Stignani (1903–1974), Italian opera singer
- Ebe W. Tunnell (1844–1917), 50th governor of Delaware

Surname

- Thierry Ebe (born 1976), Swiss footballer
- Valerie Ebe (born 1947), Nigerian lawyer

== Other uses ==
- Ebe (schooner), an Italian training ship
- Extraterrestrial Biological Entity
- "E.B.E." (The X-Files), an episode of The X-Files
- European Bridges Ensemble, a music group
- Evidence-based education
