= Egis =

Egis or EGIS may refer to:

- An alternative spelling for aegis
- Egyptian General Intelligence Service, the intelligence agency of Egypt
- Egis Group, a French engineering and consulting group
- Erieye Ground Interface Segment, a military software package which is part of the Erieye radar system
