= Surangkana Wayuparb =

Thai business executive & politician

- สุรางคณา วายุภาพ
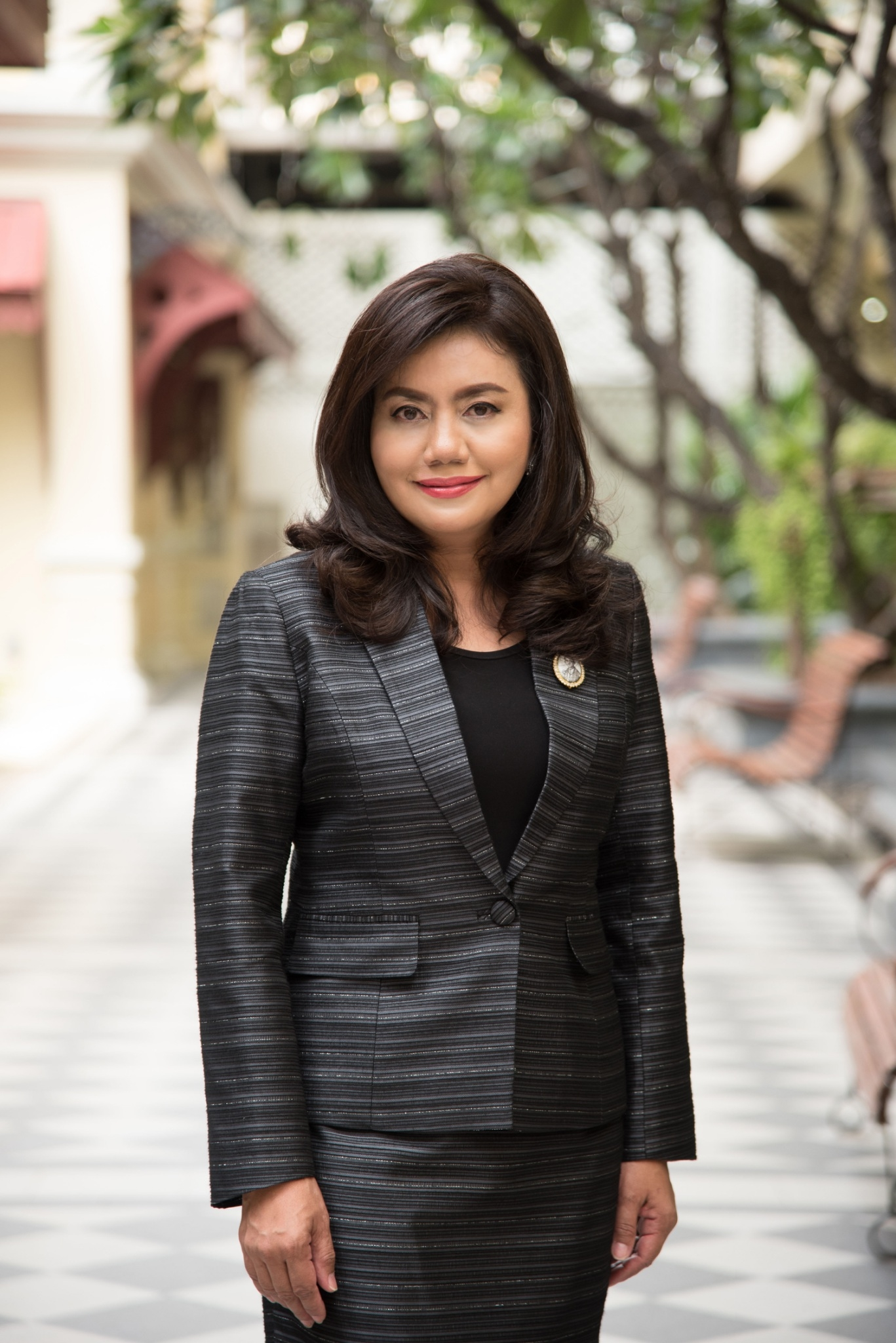
- Born: August 10, 1966 (age 59)
- Education: Bachelor - Laws, Thammasat University; Master - International Laws, Thammasat University; Director Certification Program, Capital Market Academy
- Known for: CEO, ETDA Thailand; CEO and co-founder, beTECH Kumpany
- Spouse: Pairote Wayuparb (m. 2002)
- Children: 3
- Website: betech.co.th

Surangkana Wayuparb (Thai: สุรางคณา วายุภาพ) is a Thai business executive and former politician who has worked in the private and public sector, and who has been influential in drafting Thailand's IT and digital laws. She is currently CEO of beTECH Kumpany.

== Early life and education ==
Surangkana was born in Nakhon Sri Thammarat and completed her secondary schooling from Benjamarachuthit School. She graduated from Thammasat University with a bachelor's degree in law and master's degree in international law.

== Career ==
=== Law ===
Surangkana was appointed head of the Royal Thai Government's IT law development project known as National Electronic Computer and Technology Center (NECTEC). She was instrumental in the development of information technology laws for Thailand, such as the Electronic Transaction Act, Computer Crime Law, Data Protection Law and Cybersecurity Law. She played a key role in the development of standards and laws related to e-Transactions and the establishment of monitoring systems related to security in electronic transactions.

=== ETDA ===
Surangkana was appointed executive director and CEO of Electronic Transactions Development Agency (ETDA), a public organization under the Ministry of Digital Economy and Society, Royal Thai Government, when it was set up in 2011. ETDA was responsible for developing and promoting secure e-commerce and e-transactions in Thailand. Under her leadership, ETDA proposed many laws to the government to support digitization in Thailand. It formulated digital infrastructure such as ThaiCERT monitoring cyber security, National Root Certification Authority which verifies digital signatures, and National Payment Message Standard for commercial banking. She held the position until 2019 when she resigned to set up her own start-up. Also during that time Surangkana was appointed president of Thailand PKI Association, which promotes the deployment of encryption and digital signature technology.

=== Political work ===
Surangkana was appointed to the National Legislative Assembly following the 2014 Thai coup d'état. Prior to that she was an advisor to the Ministry of Information and Communication Technology (now the Ministry of Digital Economy and Society). During her tenure she served on a committee for information technology and health care. She stayed in the NLA until the March 2019 national election.

=== beTECH Kumpany ===
On January 8, 2020, Surangkana set up BeTech Tech Kumpany with the aim of strengthening e-commerce businesses and government via law compliance in the fields of regulatory technology and government technology. More recently it has concentrated on building a PDPA (Personal Data Protection Act) platform to help businesses with law compliance at a regional level.

== Personal life ==
Surangkana is married to Pairoj Wayuparb, the former president of the Supreme Court of Thailand. They have 3 children.

== Awards and recognitions ==
2021 Knight Grand Cordon (Special Class) of the Most Exalted Order of the White Elephant
