= EDAC =

EDAC may refer to:

== Science and technology ==
- Excessive dynamic airway collapse, a medical condition
- Error detection and correction, techniques that enable reliable delivery of digital data over unreliable communication channels
  - EDAC (Linux), a set of Linux kernel modules for handling hardware-related errors
- 1-Ethyl-3-(3-dimethylaminopropyl)carbodiimide, a water-soluble carbodiimide

== Other uses ==
- Leipzig–Altenburg Airport (ICAO code), Germany
- Electronic Design Automation Consortium
