= ENT =

Otorhinolaryngology, ear, nose and throat medical specialty

Ent or ENT may also refer to:

== Arts and entertainment ==
- Ents, tree creatures in the Lord of the Rings novel
- Ent (comics), a Marvel character
- Extreme Noise Terror, a British grindcore band
- Star Trek: Enterprise, a science fiction TV series

== People ==
- Bas Ent (born 1987), Dutch footballer
- George Ent (1604–1689), English anatomist
- Uzal Girard Ent (1900–1948), U.S. Air Force officer

== Science and medicine ==
- Ent-, prefix for the opposite enantiomer of a chemical
- Equilibrative nucleoside transporter, a protein
- Otorhinolaryngology, medical specialty of the ear, nose and throat (ENT)

== Technology ==
- Electronic notetaking
- Enfilade (Xanadu), a data structure
- Rossignol ENT, an automatic rifle
- Electrical nonmetallic tubing; a type of electrical conduit

== Transport ==
- Former Ent Air Force Base, Colorado Springs, US
- Enewetak Auxiliary Airfield, Marshall Islands, IATA code

== Other uses ==
- Ent Credit Union, US
- Former ENT Ltd., Australian media company
