= Eyd (disambiguation) =

Eyd or EYD may refer to:

- Chah-e Eyd, a village in Iran
- Perfected Spelling (Indonesian), the Enhanced Indonesian Spelling System
- Eurovision Young Dancers, a dance competition

== See also ==
- Eid (disambiguation)
