= EBT =

EBT may refer to:

== Commerce and economics ==
- Earnings before taxes, in accounting and finance
- Electronic benefit transfer, in the United States, for welfare payments
- Employee benefit trust
- EuroBillTracker, a website for tracking Euro banknotes
- Exim Bank (Tanzania)

== Science and technology ==
- Electron beam computed tomography
- Electron beam texturing
- Electron beam therapy
- Electronic benefit transfer
- Eriochrome Black T, a chemical indicator used in tests
- Evidence-based toxicology

== Other uses ==
- Early Buddhist texts
- East Broad Top Railroad and Coal Company, an American railway
- Edenbridge Town railway station, in England
- Emery, Bird, Thayer Dry Goods Company, a defunct department store in Kansas City, Missouri
- The Esther Benjamins Trust, a British charity
- European Bowling Tour
- Examination before trial
- High School of Enterprise, Business, & Technology, in Brooklyn, New York City
- Eng Bee Tin, Philippine brand
