= ETLA =

ETLA can refer to:

- Research Institute of the Finnish Economy, a major Finnish think tank for economic, policy and social studies
- Extended three-letter acronym, four-letter acronym, four-letter abbreviation
- Enterprise Term License Agreement, a type of license agreement for organizations for Adobe Inc. products.

Etla can refer to:

- Etla District, part of the Valles Centrales region of the state of Oaxaca, Mexico.
- The town and municipality officially known as Villa de Etla in Oaxaca, Mexico.
- The town and municipality officially known as San Agustín Etla in Oaxaca, Mexico.
