= Eny =

Eny or ENY may refer to:

- Eny Erlangga (born 1981), Indonesian badminton player
- Eny Widiowati (born 1980), Indonesian badminton player
- ENY, the IATA location identifier for Yan'an Nanniwan Airport, China
- ENY, the ICAO airline designator for Envoy Air
- The New York City neighborhood abbreviated for East New York in eastern Brooklyn
