= EPO =

EPO or epo may refer to:

== Organisations ==
- EPO (publisher), Belgium
- European Patent Office
- Evansville Philharmonic Orchestra, US

== Science and technology ==
- Education and public outreach
- Electrolytic plasma oxidation, a metal surface treatment process
- Emergency power off
- Erythropoietin, a red blood cell production hormone and performance-enhancing drug
- Evening primrose oil
- Eosinophil peroxidase, an enzyme

== Other uses ==
- Emergency Powers Order, per the Irish Emergency Powers Act 1939
- Emergency protection order, under the UK's Children Act 1989
- Epo (musician), Indonesian hip hop musician
- EPO (singer) (born 1960), Japanese singer
- Esperanto (ISO 639-2 code), a constructed language
- European Payment Order, a debt-collecting system in the EU
- Exclusive provider organization, in US health insurance
