= EFTA (disambiguation) =

EFTA is the European Free Trade Association, a trade organisation and free trade area.

EFTA may also refer to:

- European Fair Trade Association, an association of eleven fair trade importers
- European Federation of Taiwanese Associations
- Electronic Fund Transfer Act, act passed by the U.S. Congress in 1978
- Epstein Files Transparency Act, an act passed by the U.S. Congress to force the Department of Justice to declassify and release all files related to Jeffrey Epstein

== See also ==
- Free trade areas in Europe
