= EBW =

EBW may refer to:

- Electron beam welding, a fusion welding process
- Exploding bridgewire detonator, a device for detonating explosive charges
- European Bike Week, an annual event held at the Faaker See in Carinthia, Austria for fans of motorbikes
- EBW (rail company) (also known as "EBW cargo"), a private rail cargo company based in Dachau, Germany
