= Eg, Afghanistan =

Coordinates: 34°04′N 67°08′E

Eg is a town of almost 2,500 residents in Waras District in Bamyan Province, Afghanistan. It is located at 34.0667 N latitude, 67.1167 longitude at an altitude of approximately 2,800 meters (9,200 feet), near the towns of Pshin Mazar, Zergak and Zerko.

== Climate ==
The town has a subarctic climate (Köppen: Dsc) with mild, dry summers and cold, long winters.

Climate data for Eg, Bamyan Province (1988-2017)
Month	Jan	Feb	Mar	Apr	May	Jun	Jul	Aug	Sep	Oct	Nov	Dec	Year
Daily mean °C (°F)	−11.3 (11.7)	−11.8 (10.8)	−5.0 (23.0)	2.1 (35.8)	6.7 (44.1)	11.6 (52.9)	13.5 (56.3)	12.8 (55.0)	8.3 (46.9)	2.6 (36.7)	−3.5 (25.7)	−7.4 (18.7)	1.6 (34.8)
Average precipitation mm (inches)	37.7 (1.48)	88.3 (3.48)	82.7 (3.26)	77.6 (3.06)	38.8 (1.53)	26.9 (1.06)	13.5 (0.53)	28.7 (1.13)	22.8 (0.90)	36.3 (1.43)	23.7 (0.93)	29.2 (1.15)	506.2 (19.94)
Source: ClimateCharts.net
