= EOTS =

EOTS may refer to:

- Electro-Optical Targeting System, a military targeting system
- Elf on the Shelf, a festive season children’s toy
- Enema of the State, the third studio album by American pop-punk band Blink-182
- Enemy of the state is a political / criminal term
- Empire of the Sun (novel), a 1984 novel by J. G. Ballard
  - Empire of the Sun (film), a film adaptation of the novel
- Empire of the Sun (band), an Australian synthpop duo
- Employee Ownership Trusts, a type of employee trust
