= Hamad Al-Easa =

Kuwaiti footballer

Personal information
- Date of birth: 9 January 1972 (age 54)
- Position: Defender

International career
Years	Team	Apps	(Gls)
- Kuwait

Hamad Al-Easa (born 9 January 1972) is a Kuwaiti footballer. He competed in the men's tournament at the 1992 Summer Olympics.
