= EGP =

EGP may refer to:

== Organizations ==
- Edinburgh Global Partnerships, a student-run charity
- Guerrilla Army of the Poor (Spanish: Ejército Guerrillero de los Pobres), in Guatemala
- European Green Party, a political party

== Technology ==
- Experimental Geodetic Payload, Japanese satellite
- Exploration Gateway Platform, 2012 Boeing-NASA discussion for a space station
- Exterior gateway protocol, a class of routing protocols used between Autonomous Systems
- Exterior Gateway Protocol, a specific protocol formerly used on the Internet

== Other uses ==
- Eagle Pass Municipal Airport
- Eastern Gas Pipeline, in Australia
- Egyptian pound, the currency of Egypt
- Enel Green Power, an Italian energy company
- Engineered Glass Products, an American manufacturing company
