= EPL =

EPL may refer to:

== Computing ==
- Easy Programming Language
- Eclipse Public License
- Eltron Programming Language, a control language for various computer printers
- Ethernet Powerlink, an Ethernet protocol
- Early PL/I, a PL/I subset dialect used to write Multics

== Anatomy ==
- Extensor pollicis longus muscle
- External plexiform layer

== Education ==
- École polytechnique de Louvain, faculty of engineering science at the University of Louvain (UCLouvain), Belgium

== Libraries ==
- Edmonton Public Library, in Alberta, Canada
- Euclid Public Library, in, Ohio, United States
- Evanston Public Library, in Illinois, United States
- Everett Public Library, in Washington, United States

== Publications ==
- EPL (journal), a scientific journal
- Eesti Päevaleht, an Estonian newspaper

== Sports ==
- Egyptian Premier League
- English Premier League
- ESL Pro League, a professional Counter-Strike: Global Offensive league
- Everest Premier League, a Nepali cricket league

== Other uses ==
- Edinburgh Partners, a Scottish investment firm
- El Pollo Loco, an American restaurant chain
- Employment practices liability
- Employment protection legislation
- Escola Portuguesa de Luanda, a Portuguese international school in Angola
- Popular Liberation Army (Spanish: Ejército Popular de Liberación), a Colombian guerrilla group
