= Eha Lättemäe =

Estonian poet and translator

Eha Lättemäe (2 September 1922 Mõnnaste – 14 November 2012 Tallinn) was an Estonian poet who also wrote poems in Finnish. In addition, she translated Finnish poetry into Estonian and Estonian poetry into Finnish. Beginning in 1971, she worked as a professional writer.

== Awards ==
In 2008, Lättemäe was given the Juhan Liiv Poetry Award for her poem "Kui talveöö on paratamatu..." ('If a Winter Night Is Inevitable').

== Collections ==
- Oma sammude varjust (1968)
- Uskoon aurinkoon (1969)
- Pääsuke päevalind (1971)
- Nõnda ma lähen (1973)
- Metsamarju. Mõtsamarju (1974)
- Poimin marjoja sinisestä metsästä (1975)
- Kahel häälel (1981) (with father Andres Lättemäe)
- Elulugu (1981)
- Iltakävelyllä / Õhtune jalutuskäik (2003)
