= Envirolink Northwest =

Envirolink Northwest was an organisation which existed to promote, strengthen and support the Low Carbon and Environmental Goods and Services (LCEGS) sector in England's Northwest. The not-for-profit organisation went into liquidation in January 2013.

Set up in 1999, at its peak in 2010 Envirolink Northwest employed 90 staff and turned over £6m. It was based at offices in Birchwood, Warrington. Envirolink hosted a network of over 1500 companies based in the region related to the environment. Envirolink is supported by the Northwest Development Agency.

The goals of Envirolink Northwest were:

- Helping companies to find and win new business both at home and abroad
- Fostering environmental innovation through unlocking funding for research and development and demonstration of environmental technologies
- Bringing regional companies and research bodies together to develop new technologies, products and commercial ventures
- Developing the skills and talents necessary to grow the environmental industry
- Representing the environmental sector regionally, nationally, and internationally

Between 2007 and 2010, the organization delivered a comprehensive events programme and could boast 150 individual events ranging from ‘meet the buyer’ to funding clinics. Over 400 delegates in total attended the region's flagship conference and exhibition, Envirenergy North West, which was managed by Envirolink Northwest.
