= Edakkad railway station =

Railway station in Kerala, India

Edakkad

General information
- Location: Edakkad, Kannur, Kerala; India
- Coordinates: 11.80606°N 75.44375°E
- System: Regional, light rail & commuter station
- Owner: Indian Railways
- Operator: Southern Railway zone
- Line: Shoranur–Mangalore line
- Platforms: 3
- Tracks: 4

Construction
- Structure type: At–grade
- Parking: Available

Other information
- Status: Functioning
- Station code: ETK
- Zone(s): Southern Railway zone
- Division(s): Palakkad
- Fare zone: Indian Railways

History
- Opened: 1904; 122 years ago
Location
- Location within India Location within Kerala

Etakkot railway station (code: ETK) is a railway station in Kannur district, Kerala and falls under the Palakkad railway division of the Southern Railway zone, Indian Railways. It is one of the busiest stations in Edakkad.

== Trains stopping at Edakkad ==
Towards Kannur:

- Kozhikode–Kannur Passenger
- Trissur–Kannur Passenger
- Kozhikode–Kannur Passenger
- Coimbatore–Kannur Fast Passenger

Towards Kozhikode:

- Kannur–Coimbatore Fast Passenger
- Mangaluru–Kozhikode Passenger
- Kannur–Shornur Passenger
- Kannur–Kozhikode Passenger
