= EBD =

EBD may refer to:

== Health and medicine ==
- Emotional and behavioral disorders
- Epidermolysis bullosa dystrophica, disease affecting the skin and other organs
- Evidence-based dentistry
- Extensor digitorum brevis, muscle in the foot

== Other uses ==
- Ebbsfleet International railway station, in England
- Elections and Boundaries Department of Belize
- Electronic brakeforce distribution, automobile technology
- Evidence-based design, physical design based on scientific principles
- Exim Bank (Djibouti), a commercial bank
