= Ewe =

A ewe is a female sheep.

Ewe or EWE may also refer to:

== Culture ==
- Ewe people, an ethnic group in the Eastern parts of Ghana, Benin and Togo
  - Ewe language
  - Ewe music

== Geography ==
- Isle of Ewe, an island off the west coast of Scotland
- Loch Ewe, a sea loch in Scotland
- St Ewe, a village in Cornwall

== People ==
- David Ewe, New Zealand rugby player
- Donna Ewe, New Zealand rugby union player

== Transportation ==
- Eurowings Europe, an Austrian airline
- Ewell East railway station in Surrey, England
- Ewer Airport, in Indonesia

== Other uses ==
- Ecopath with Ecosim (EwE), an ecological computer modelling system for fisheries
- EWE Baskets Oldenburg, a German basketball team
- Large EWE Arena in Oldenburg, Germany
- Small EWE Arena in Oldenburg, Germany
