= Ene =

Ene or ENE may refer to:

== Ene ==
- Ene (name), a given name and surname
- Ene, a type of hydrocarbon involved in the Ene reaction and the Thiol-ene reaction
- -ene, a suffix used in the names of certain organic compounds (alkenes)
- Ene, Spanish abbreviation for January
- Eñe, the Spanish name of the letter ñ
- Ene River, in Peru

== ENE ==
- East-northeast, a compass point and an intercardinal direction
- Ee Nagaraniki Emaindhi, often abbreviated as ENE, 2018 Indian Telugu-language film
- Empresa Nacional de Electricidade de Angola, former company of Angola
- ENE, the IATA airport code for Ende Airport, serving Flores, Indonesia
- ENE, NYSE ticker symbol for Enron, a defunct American energy company
- Eneolithic, an archaeological period
- Early neutral evaluation, a form of alternative dispute resolution aimed at reaching an early settlement
- End-point network element, a type of network element found in computer and telecommunications networks
- ENE, Emergent, Networked, Event-driven (ENE) process. Sometimes END
