= EEO =

EEO may refer to:

- Electroendosmosis
- Equal employment opportunity
- European Enforcement Order
