= Emo (disambiguation) =

Emo (originally short for "emotional hardcore" or "emocore") is a style of rock music.

Emo may also refer to:

== Businesses ==
- Certa (oil), an Irish oil company formerly known as Emo
- Chamber of Electrical Engineers of Turkey, established in 1954
- Educational Management Organization or for-profit school
- Emo Speedway, a racetrack in Emo, Ontario
- Emo's, a nightclub in Austin, Texas

== Music ==
- Emo (album), an album by Screeching Weasel
- Emo, an album by Sari Kaasinen
- "Emo", a song by Blink-182 from the band's album Dude Ranch

== Places ==
- Emo, County Laois, a village in Ireland
- Emo Court, a mansion in County Laois, Ireland
- Emo, Ontario, a town in Canada
- Villa Emo, a villa in Italy
- Emo Park, a city park in Adelaide, South Australia
- East Moriches, a town on Long Island

== People ==
- Emo (name)
- E-Mo, a character in the U.S. TV series A Gifted Man
- A character in the 3D animated short film Elephants Dream
- Uncle Emo, a character in Story Teller (magazine)

== Other ==
- Emo subculture, based around emo music
- EMO (trade show), an international metal-working industry trade show held in Europe
- EMO EMergency Off (switch), see Kill switch, ISO 13850 (Safety of machinery – Emergency stop function – Principles for design) and SEMI S2 Standard (semiconductor industry)
- Extra man offense in field lacrosse
- Emergency Management Office, also referred to as an "Office of Emergency Management"
- Emo vorticaudum, a genus of fossil aplacophoran mollusc

== See also ==
- Eno (disambiguation)
