= ECW =

ECW may refer to:

== Professional wrestling ==
- Extreme Championship Wrestling (originally Eastern Championship Wrestling), a professional wrestling promotion that operated from 1992 to 2001
- The Alliance (professional wrestling) (originally the WCW/ECW Alliance), a 2001 World Wrestling Federation stable that included Extreme Championship Wrestling
- ECW (WWE brand), a World Wrestling Entertainment brand from 2006 to 2010 based on the Extreme Championship Wrestling promotion

=== Wrestling television programs ===
- ECW Hardcore TV, produced by the Extreme Championship Wrestling promotion from 1993 until 2000
- ECW on TNN, produced by the Extreme Championship Wrestling promotion from 1999 to 2000
- WWE ECW, produced by World Wrestling Entertainment from 2006 to 2010 based on the Extreme Championship Wrestling promotion

== Military ==
- Electronic counter-warfare, a set of military measures to counteract enemy radars, missile-guidance, etc.
- English Civil War(s), a series of armed conflicts and political machinations which occurred in England from 1642 to 1651

== Other ==
- Eastern Coach Works, a defunct bus body building company from England
- ECW (file format), an enhanced compressed wavelet file format designed for geospatial imagery
- ECW model in chemistry for Lewis acid–Lewis base interactions
- ECW Press, a Canadian book publisher
- Extreme Cold Warnings are issued to inform the public about active or imminent severe cold temperatures in their region that are expected to last for a while; examples:
  - In the U.S., when temperatures fall to −35 °F (−37 °C) or colder with winds of less than 5 mph (8 km/h; 2 m/s)
  - In Canada, based on either the temperature or the wind chill being a certain value for at least 2 hours; the values range from −30 °C (−22 °F) in the warm temperates to −55 °C (−67 °F) in parts of the Arctic
- Extreme Cold Weather clothing for arctic or mountainous areas
  - Extended Cold Weather Clothing System worn by members of the United States Army
