= Voluntary collective licensing =

Voluntary collective licensing is an alternative approach to solve the problem of software piracy using file sharing technologies. The idea is to make file sharing networks subscribe-only for a small fee and then distribute the collected money among the artists based on the popularity of their work. It has been endorsed since 2003 by the EFF.

Arguably Spotify is an implementation of this idea, although it is not marketed as a file-sharing network and also allows ad-supported free use in addition to paid use.

== Supporters of this licensing project ==
- Downhill Battle
- Berkman Center for Internet & Society also launched Digital Media Exchange (DMX), a P2P content service, operated as a non-profit cooperative which uses the same concept.

== See also ==
- Threshold pledge system
