= Eastman Credit Union =

Credit union headquartered in Kingsport, Tennessee

- Company type: Credit union
- Industry: Financial services
- Founded: September 1934; 91 years ago
- Headquarters: Kingsport, Tennessee, U.S.
- Number of locations: 35 Branches, Service Centers, and Offices
- Key people: Kelly Price, (CEO)
- Products: Savings; checking; consumer loans; mortgages; investments; online banking
- Total assets: $9.3 billion USD
- Website: ecu.org

Eastman Credit Union

Eastman Credit Union (ECU) is a not-for-profit financial cooperative headquartered in Kingsport, Tennessee. Established in 1934, ECU has grown to serve over 348,000 members across Tennessee, Virginia, and Texas. ECU is ranked 34 on the list of the largest 100 credit unions in the United States.

History

ECU was chartered on September 10, 1934, initially serving employees of the Tennessee Eastman Chemical Company. Operating from a makeshift office on the plant site, the credit union aimed to provide financial services to its members. ECU now operates 35 branches within its field of membership (FOM). In 2005, it expanded to a community charter, opening membership to the wider community. In 2024, ECU celebrated its 90th anniversary.

Awards

In 2024, ECU was designated as the "Nation's #1 Best-Performing Credit Union" by S&P Global Market Intelligence.
