= ETM =

ETM may refer to:

- E_{TM}, a name given in Computer Science to the set of all Turing Machines which never reach an accepting state.
- Encrypt-then-MAC
- Energy and Technology Museum, in Vilnius, Lithuania
- Entercom, an American broadcasting company
- Erythromycin in report-related contexts
- Estuarine turbidity maximum
- European Travel Monitor
- Ramon International Airport, in Israel

== See also ==
- ETM+, an instrument on the Landsat 7 satellite
