= ECCM =

ECCM may refer to:

- European Culture Collections' Organisation
- Electronic counter-countermeasures
- East Caribbean Common Market
- European Conference on Composite Materials
