= E.M.G. Hand-Made Gramophones =

E.M.G. Mark Xa Table Grand c. 1932. Originally part of the Ian Calderbank Collection of Gramophones.

E.M.G. Hand-Made Gramophones Limited was founded in 1923 by Ellis Michael Ginn (whose initials gave the firm its name). Its object was to build and sell high class acoustical gramophones. E.M.G.'s first model was the Magnaphone, demonstrated and sold in Brighton in March 1924.

Following the Brighton success, the firm moved to London. In the Steinway Hall Gramophone Tests of June 14, 1924, sponsored by Gramophone Magazine, E.M.G.'s Magnaphone was awarded the Silver Medal. Following these Tests, Compton Mackenzie, editor of the Gramophone Magazine wrote that "it is an instrument with a very big future before it".

At the Gramophone Congress of 1925 held in Caxton Hall, E.M.G. won the Bronze Medal.

In 1928, Frederick Delius wrote to Ginn to congratulate him on the E.M.G. Wilson Horn model: "I often use it to play records of my own works to musicians who come to see me, and they all think it splendid."

In the wake of financial difficulties experienced in 1929, control of the company passed out of the hands of Ginn, who subsequently set up in competition to E.M.G., producing hand-made gramophones under the 'Expert' brand.

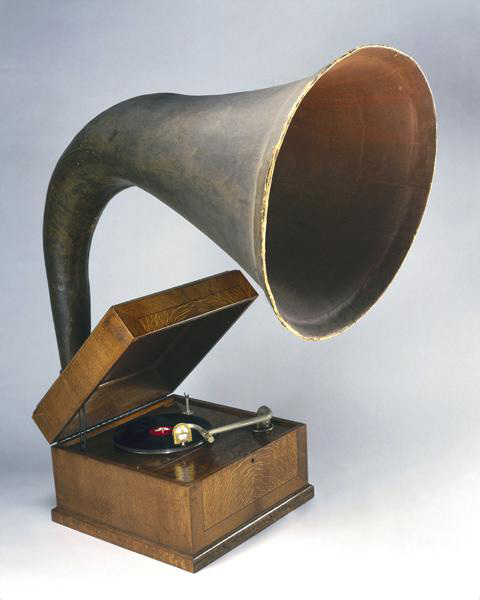
Expert Junior, manufactured 1930

Although by 1933, E.M.G. was also offering electric gramophones, its acoustic models still enjoyed a buoyant market. Compton Mackenzie offered an explanation in his April 1933 Gramophone editorial: “[T]here are still many people living in remote parts of this Earth for whom a radio-gramophone is an impossibility. For those, instruments like the Expert, the E.M.G. and the Cascade are a wonderful substitute for the electric wonders of today.” Francis James expands this explanation: "[W]hat could be more nostalgic [for British colonial officers] than an E.M.G. playing Elgar under the black velvet of a night on the African Veldt? It was not just colonial officers who ordered them, of course. Wherever there was a regimental mess, an embassy or diplomatic mission, a wealthy merchant or a religious mission, in short, wherever there were islands of British culture in a foreign land, there these acoustic machines would be found. The whole British Empire resounded to their beautiful voices."

Between 1928 and 1954, E.M.G. was awarded 16 patents relating to sound reproduction.

The firm went into voluntary liquidation in 1980, having produced and sold around 1500 made-to-order acoustical gramophones. More than 80 of the Mark IX, X, Xa and Xb EMG 'Large Horn' gramophones are known to still survive.

== Sources ==
James, Francis (1998). The E.M.G Story. London: Old Bakehouse Publications. ISBN 1-874538-27-1.

Wimbush, Roger ed. (1973). "The Gramophone" Jubilee Book 1923-1973. Harrow: General Gramophone Publications Ltd.ISBN 0902470043.
