= ESV (disambiguation) =

ESV is an abbreviation of the English Standard Version, a translation of the Bible in contemporary English.

ESV may also refer to:

- Emergency shutdown valve
- Employer-supported volunteering, a form of corporate volunteering
- End-systolic volume
- ESV, a brand of Cadillac Escalade
- Exact sequence variant, also called an amplicon sequence variant
- Experimental safety vehicle
- M1132 engineer squad vehicle
- Engineering Standards and Validation, a term specific to some quality assurance roles and processes in engineering
