= EHF (gene) =

Protein-coding gene in the species Homo sapiens

Identifiers
- Aliases: EHF, ESE3, ESE3B, ESEJ, ETS homologous factor
- External IDs: OMIM: 605439; MGI: 1270840; GeneCards: EHF

Gene location (Human)
Chr.	Chromosome 11 (human)
Band	11p13	Start	34,621,093 bp
Band	11p13	End	34,661,057 bp

Gene location (Mouse)
Chr.	Chromosome 2 (mouse)
Band	2|2 E2	Start	103,093,778 bp
Band	2|2 E2	End	103,133,623 bp
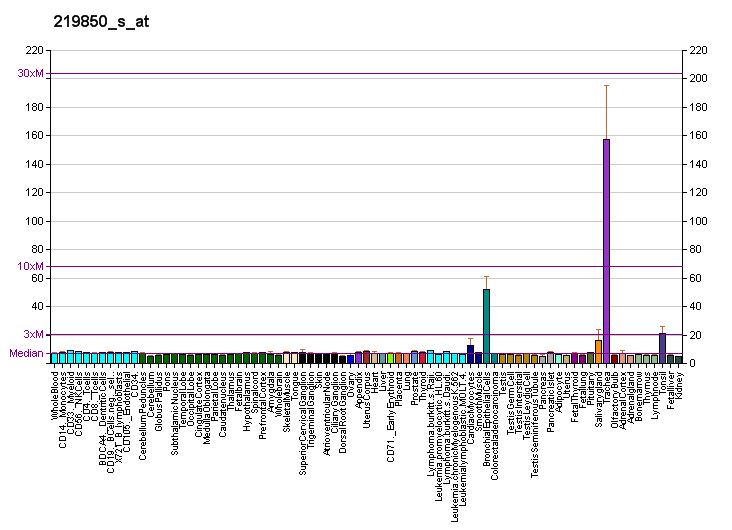
RNA expression pattern
Bgee	Human / Mouse (ortholog); Top expressed in: parotid gland; gingival epithelium; seminal vesicula; oral cavity; bronchial epithelial cell; mucosa of sigmoid colon; epithelium of nasopharynx; skin of thigh; vulva; mucosa of pharynx / Top expressed in: lacrimal gland; submandibular gland; parotid gland; prostate; lobe of prostate; left colon; mucosa of urinary bladder; transitional epithelium of urinary bladder; conjunctival fornix; seminal vesicula; More reference expression data
BioGPS	More reference expression data
Gene ontology
Molecular function	DNA-binding transcription factor activity; RNA polymerase II cis-regulatory region sequence-specific DNA binding; DNA binding; sequence-specific DNA binding; DNA-binding transcription activator activity, RNA polymerase II-specific; DNA-binding transcription factor activity, RNA polymerase II-specific
Cellular component	Golgi apparatus; nucleoplasm; nucleus
Biological process	multicellular organism development; positive regulation of transcription, DNA-templated; cell population proliferation; epithelial cell proliferation; regulation of transcription, DNA-templated; epithelial cell differentiation; transcription by RNA polymerase II; transcription, DNA-templated; positive regulation of transcription by RNA polymerase II; regulation of transcription by RNA polymerase II; cell differentiation
Sources:Amigo / QuickGO
Orthologs
Databases	NCBI: entry; OMA: entry
Species	Human	Mouse
Entrez	26298	13661
Ensembl	ENSG00000135373	ENSMUSG00000012350
UniProt	Q9NZC4	O70273
RefSeq (mRNA)	NM_001206615; NM_001206616; NM_012153	NM_007914
RefSeq (protein)	NP_001193544; NP_001193545; NP_036285; NP_001364970; NP_001364971 NP_001364972; NP_001364973; NP_001364974; NP_001364975; NP_001364976; NP_001364977; NP_001364978; NP_001364979; NP_001364980; NP_001364981; NP_001364982; NP_001364983; NP_001364984; NP_001364985	NP_031940
Location (UCSC)	Chr 11: 34.62 – 34.66 Mb	Chr 2: 103.09 – 103.13 Mb
PubMed search
- Wikidata
View/Edit Human	View/Edit Mouse

ETS homologous factor is a protein that in humans is encoded by the EHF gene. This gene encodes a protein that belongs to an ETS transcription factor subfamily characterized by epithelial-specific expression (ESEs). The encoded protein acts as a transcriptional repressor and may be associated with asthma susceptibility. This protein may be involved in epithelial differentiation and carcinogenesis.

Cangemi, R., Mensah, A., Albertini, V., Jain, A., Mello-Grand, M., Chiorino, G., Catapano, C.V. & Carbone, G.M. Reduced expression and tumor suppressor function of the ETS transcription factor ESE-3 in prostate cancer. Oncogene 27, 2877-2885 (2008).

Albino D, Longoni N, Curti L, Mello-Grand M, Pinton S, Civenni G, Thalmann G, D'Ambrosio G, Sarti M, Sessa F, Chiorino G, Catapano CV, Carbone GM. ESE3/EHF controls epithelial cell differentiation and its loss leads to prostate tumors with mesenchymal and stem-like features. Cancer Res. 2012 Jun 1;72(11):2889-900.

Kunderfranco, P., Mello-Grand, M., Cangemi, R., Pellini, S., Mensah, A., Albertini, V., Malek, A., Chiorino, G., Catapano, C.V. & Carbone, G.M. ETS transcription factors control transcription of EZH2 and epigenetic silencing of the tumor suppressor gene Nkx3.1 in prostate cancer. PLoS One 5, e10547 (2010).
