= ERTS =

ERTS may refer to:

- Erts, a village in Andorra
- Landsat 1, originally named "Earth Resources Technology Satellite 1"
- Electronic Arts
- ERT (disambiguation)
