= ETF =

ETF may refer to:

== Education ==
- Evangelical Theological Faculty, in Leuven, Belgium
- Protestant Theological Faculty (Evangelická teologická fakulta), Charles University, in Prague
- University of Belgrade School of Electrical Engineering, (Serbian: Elektrotehnički fakultet Univerziteta u Beogradu)

== Finance ==
- Early termination fee
- ETF Securities, a British asset management firm
- Employees' Trust Fund, a social security program of the Government of Sri Lanka
- Exchange-traded fund, a type of investment fund

== Sports ==
- Egyptian Tennis Federation
- European Tablesoccer Federation (1963–1993), see Sports table football

== Other uses ==
- ETF Ride Systems, a Dutch amusement ride manufacturer
- Electron-transferring flavoprotein
- Emergency Task Force (Toronto Police Service), of the Toronto Police Service
- Escape the Fate, an American rock band
- European Training Foundation, of the European Union
- European Transport Workers' Federation, in Brussels, Belgium
