= EQG =

EQG may refer to:

- Equatorial Guinea (FIFA country code EQG), a country in Africa
- Mercedes-Benz EQG, an electric G-class SUV
- Concept EQG, a concept car from Mercedes-Benz, an electric Mercedes-Benz G-class
- EQG, a proposed offroad SUV in the Mercedes-Benz EQ lineup
