= Eagle Air (Tanzania) =

IATA	ICAO	Call sign
-	EFL	FLYING EAGLE
- Founded: 1999

Eagle Air was an airline based in Tanzania. It offered scheduled flights within the country, including from Dar-es-Salaam to Mafia Island. In 2001, the company announced plans to expand its services to additional provincial and rural communities throughout Tanzania. The company was defunct by 2002.
