= EPW =

EPW may refer to:

- Earth Penetrating Weapon, a tactical nuclear weapon
- Economic and Political Weekly, an Indian journal/magazine
- Electric-powered wheelchair, a form of wheelchair
- Enemy prisoner of war, the U.S. military term for enemy prisoners of war (POWs)
- Exciting Pro Wrestling, a Japanese game series by Yuke's
