= EASA (disambiguation) =

EASA or Easa may refer to:

- European Union Aviation Safety Agency
- European Association of Social Anthropologists
- Ecclesiastical Architects and Surveyors Association
- English Academy of Southern Africa
- European Architecture Students Assembly
- European Academy of Sciences and Arts
- Easa (surname)
- Easa Saleh Al Gurg, businessman from the United Arab Emirates
- Easa Shareef, Maldivian film director and actor
