= Mischa Dohler =

Electronics engineer

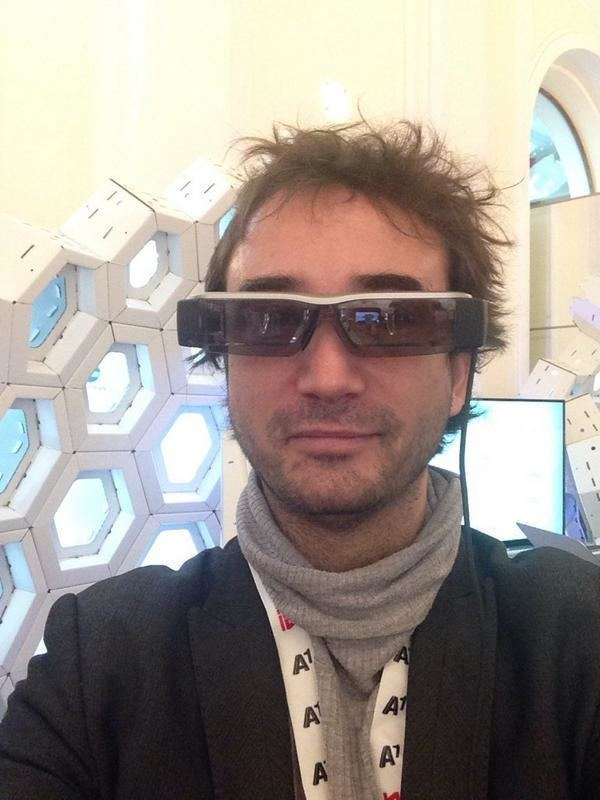
- Dohler on CNBC, 2016
- Known for: 6G systems, Internet of skills
- Scientific career
- Fields: Telecommunications, music compositions
- Website: mischadohler.com

Mischa Dohler is a Fellow of the Royal Academy of Engineering, Fellow of the Institute of Electrical and Electronics Engineers (IEEE) and Fellow of the Royal Society of Arts (RSA).

He was a Chair Professor of Wireless Communications at King's College London, where he worked on 6G and the Internet of Skills. He has been appointed to the Spectrum Advisory Board of Ofcom.

== Career ==
He was a CTO at Worldsensing. He was a CTO at Sirius Insight.
