= Electronic Temperature Instruments =

Electronic Temperature Instruments Limited
- Company type: Private
- Industry: Thermometers, test and measurement instruments
- Founded: 1983; 43 years ago in Worthing, United Kingdom
- Founder: Peter Webb MBE DL
- Headquarters: Worthing, United Kingdom
- Number of employees: 207 (2021)
- Website: thermometer.co.uk

Electronic Temperature Instruments Limited (ETI) is a worldwide manufacturer and distributor of thermometers and portable test and measurement instrumentation. ETI supplies catering, industrial, HVAC, wireless, legionnaires, refrigeration thermometers and environmental monitoring instruments to various industries. These include food production, chemical, pharmaceutical and construction services.

== History ==
The company was founded by Miriam and Peter Webb in 1983 in Worthing, West Sussex, England. The company has been privately owned since its inception.

ETI has been granted The Queen's Award for Industry for International Trade three times: in 2012, 2014, and 2017, and the Queen’s Award for Enterprise for Innovation in 2018.

== Accreditation ==
As of 2023, the company is accredited for a number of equipment calibration activities.
