= Eng Lake =

Lake in the state of Minnesota, United States

- Location within Minnesota
- Location: Douglas County, Minnesota
- Coordinates: 45°48′55″N 95°40′59″W
- Type: lake

Eng Lake is a lake in Douglas County, in the U.S. state of Minnesota.

Eng Lake was named for Erick Pehrson Eng, a pioneer settler.

The elevation level of the lake is 411 meters / 1348 feet.

== See also ==
- List of lakes in Minnesota
