= San Gabriel Valley Airport =

Airport in El Monte, California, United States

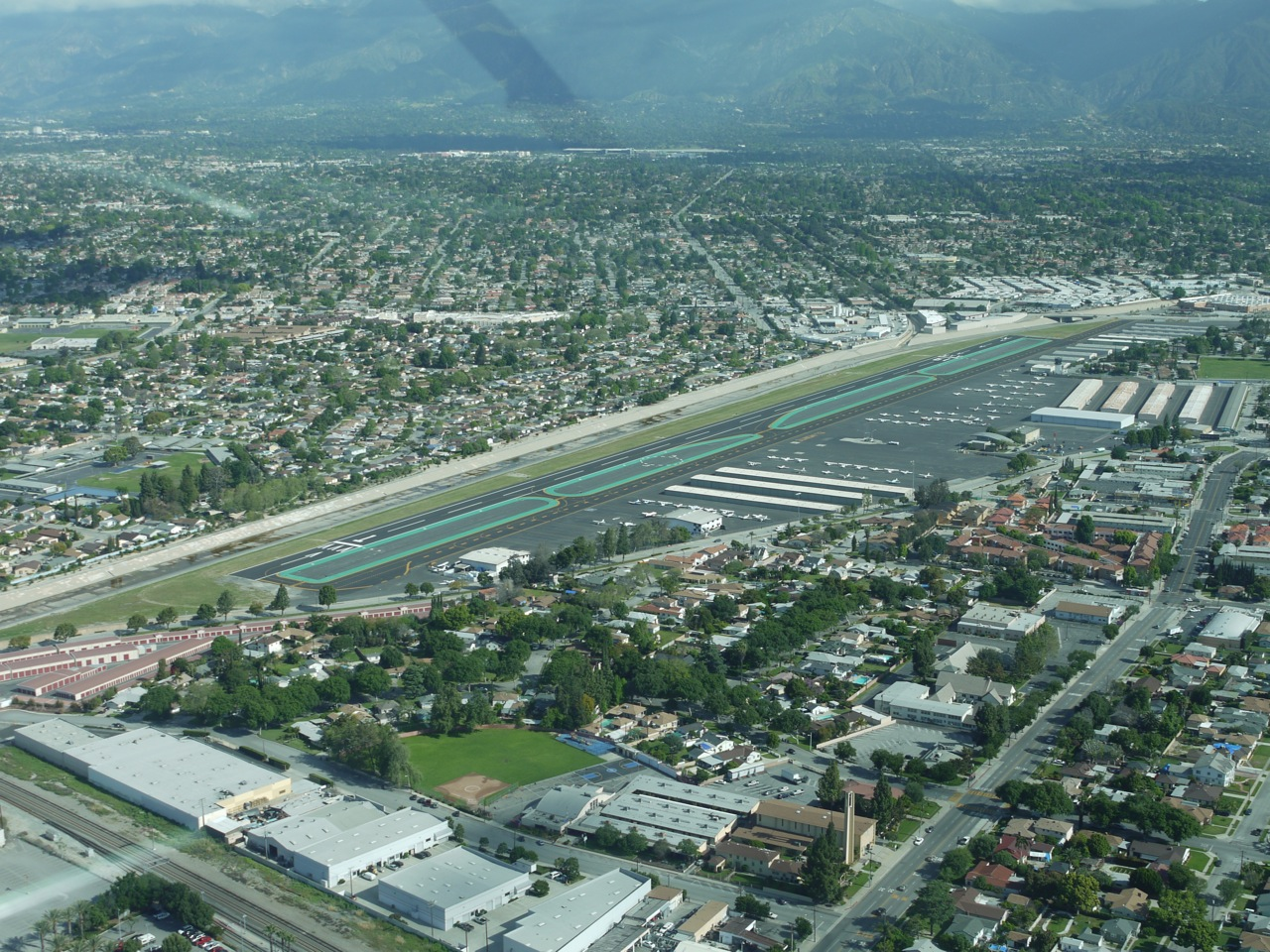
- View facing northwest
- IATA: EMT; ICAO: KEMT; FAA LID: EMT

Summary
- Airport type: Public
- Owner/Operator: County of Los Angeles
- Serves: Greater Los Angeles
- Location: El Monte, California, U.S
- Opened: April 1944; 82 years ago
- Elevation AMSL: 296 ft / 90 m
- Coordinates: 34°05′10″N 118°02′05″W
- Interactive map of San Gabriel Valley Airport

Runways
Direction	Length		Surface
Direction	ft	m	Surface
1/19	3,995	1,218	Asphalt

Statistics
- Aircraft operations (2021): 87,640
- Based aircraft (2021): 93
- Source: Federal Aviation Administration

San Gabriel Valley Airport (IATA: EMT, ICAO: KEMT, FAA LID: EMT) — formerly El Monte Airport — is a public airport in El Monte, in Los Angeles County, California, United States. In November 2014, its name was changed from El Monte Airport to San Gabriel Valley Airport.

The Federal Aviation Administration (FAA) National Plan of Integrated Airport Systems for 2019–2023 categorized it as a regional reliever general aviation facility.

== Facilities ==
The airport location is at 4233 Santa Anita Ave El Monte, CA 91731 and covers 103 acres (0.42 km^{2}) at an elevation of 295.6 feet (90.1 m). Its single runway, 1/19, is 3,995 by 75 feet (1,218 m × 23 m).

In 2021 the airport had 87,640 aircraft operations, average 240 per day: 99% general aviation, <1% air taxi, <1 commercial, and <1% military. In December 2021, 93 aircraft were based at this airport: 87 single-engine, 1 multi-engine, and 5 helicopter.
