= EAPC =

EAPC may refer to:

- Euro-Atlantic Partnership Council
- European Association of Political Consultants
- Escola d'Administració Pública de Catalunya, a public administration school in Spain
- Eilat Ashkelon Pipeline Company, also known as the Europe Asia Pipeline Company
- Eurasian Patent Convention
- Evangelical Assembly of Presbyterian Churches
- Electrically Assisted Pedal Cycle, see E-bike
- European Association for Palliative Care
