= Ei (name) =

Name list

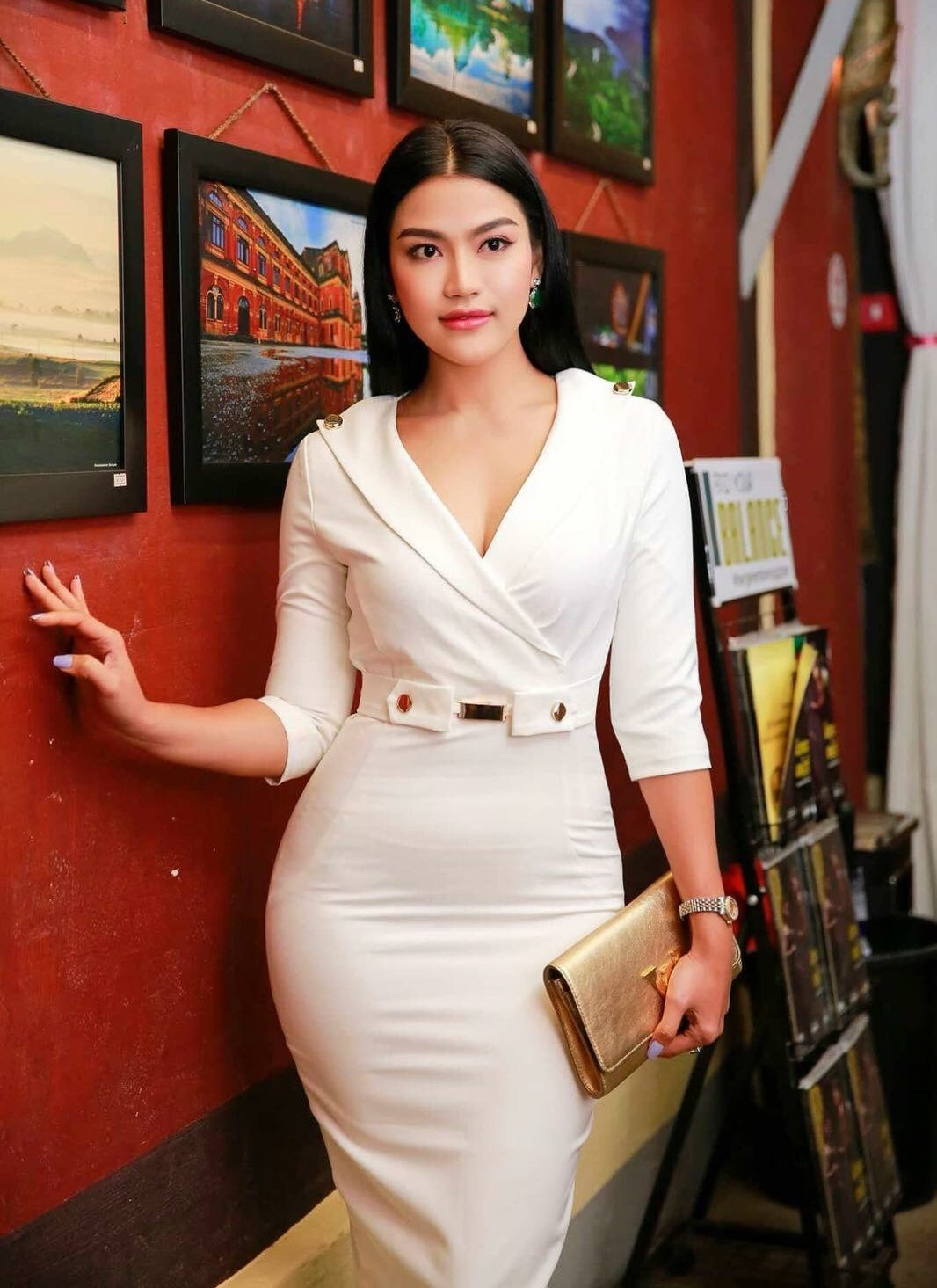
- Ei Chaw Po, Burmese actress
- Language: Burmese, Japanese

Ei is a name used in Japan and Myanmar. In Japanese naming, it is a given name and a family name. In Burmese names, which have no concept of a family name, it can be an element in any position.

== People with the surname ==
- Ei-Q (born 1911), Japanese artist
- Ei Hisatora (1558–1587), Japanese samurai of the Sengoku period
- Rokusuke Ei (1933–2016), Japanese lyricist, composer, author, essayist

== People with the given name ==
- Ei Aoki (born 1973), Japanese storyboard artist
- Ei Chaw Po (born 1990), Burmese actress, model and singer of Mon descent
- Ei Ei (born 1965), Burmese singer
- Ei Ei Thet (born 1992), Burmese swimmer
- Ei Iida (born 1967), Japanese former professional tennis player
- Ei Ogawa (1930–1994), Japanese screenwriter
- Poe Ei Ei Khant (born 1993), Burmese actress and singer
- Shō Ei (1559–1588), Japanese king of the Ryukyu Kingdom
- Wada Ei (1857–1929), Japanese textile worker and memoirist
