= EPCR =

EPCR may refer to:

- Endothelial protein C receptor, a protein encoded by the PROCR gene
- ePCR (electronic polymerase chain reaction), or in silico PCR, use of software tools to calculate PCR results
- European Professional Club Rugby, organises rugby union club championships
