= EHR =

EHR may refer to:

== Places ==
- Ehr, Germany, a municipality in Rhineland-Palatinate
- Henderson City-County Airport (FAA LID: EHR, ICAO: KEHR), in Kentucky, United States

== Other uses ==
- Bab El Ehr, a fictional character in The Adventures of Tintin by Hergé
- Electronic health record, or EHR
- European Hit Radio (Latvian: Eiropas Hītu Radio), or EHR, a commercial radio station in Baltic states
- European Hit Radio (also called European Airplay Top 50), a chart formerly compiled by Music & Media magazine
- The Economic History Review, or The EHR, an academic journal
- The English Historical Review, or The EHR, an academic journal
