= EWR (disambiguation) =

EWR is the IATA airport code for Newark Liberty International Airport.

EWR may also refer to:

== Rail ==
- East West Rail, a planned rail line in England
- East-West Railway, a planned rail line in Nepal
- Elkhart and Western Railroad, a railroad in Indiana, United States
- East Worthing railway station, Sussex, England (Network Rail station code)

== Other uses ==
- Early-warning radar, a radar detection system
- Entwicklungsring Süd, a German aircraft manufacturer
- Extreme Warfare Revenge, a computer game
