= Cardoen EC-2 mine =

Anti-personnel mine

The Cardoen EC-2 mine is a Chilean directional fragmentation anti-personnel mine. It is broadly similar to the United States M18 Claymore mine.

The mine consists of a convex rectangular plastic main body, supported by two pairs of scissor type legs. On the top of the mine is a simple blade type peep sight, on either side of which are two fuze wells that accept Number 8 detonators. The front face of the main is a pre-grooved steel plate, which produces a large number fragments when the mine is detonated. The fragments are projected in a sixty degree arc out to a maximum range of 250 meters, with a lethal range of around sixteen meters.

The mine is in service with the Chilean armed forces.

== Specifications ==
- Height: 140 mm (legs folded)
- Width: 220 mm
- Depth: 55 mm
- Weight: 1.6 kg
- Explosive content: 0.5 kg
