= ECHR =

ECHR may refer to:

- European Convention on Human Rights (ECHR)
  - European Court of Human Rights (ECtHR)
- European Commission of Human Rights, a special body of the Council of Europe 1954–1998
- East Coast Heritage Rail, a heritage train operator in Australia
- The Economic History Review (EcHR), a peer-reviewed journal
