= Ese =

ESE or Ese may refer to:

== Words ==
- Ēse, gods in Germanic paganism
- Ese language, a language of Papua New Guinea
- Ese (river), a river in the department of Corse-du-Sud, Corsica, France
- Ese Mrabure-Ajufo (born 1992), Canadian football player
- "Ese" (song), a 1998 song by Jerry Rivera

== Abbreviations ==
- Early streamer emission
- East-southeast, a compass direction (one of the eight "half-winds")
- Easy Serving Espresso Pod
- Ethical Sensory Extrovert
- European School of Economics
- European Society of Endocrinology
- Exonic splicing enhancer
- Exoskeletal engine
- Extensible Storage Engine
- Libertarian Syndicalist Union
- Massachusetts Department of Elementary and Secondary Education
