= Epos (watch manufacturer) =

Swiss watch manufacturer

Epos Uhren AG
- Industry: Watch manufacturing
- Founded: 1983 by Peter Hofer, in Biel, Switzerland
- Headquarters: Lengnau, Switzerland
- Key people: Singi Chonge (Chairman of the Board); Tamdi Chonge (CEO)
- Products: Mechanical watches
- Website: epos.ch

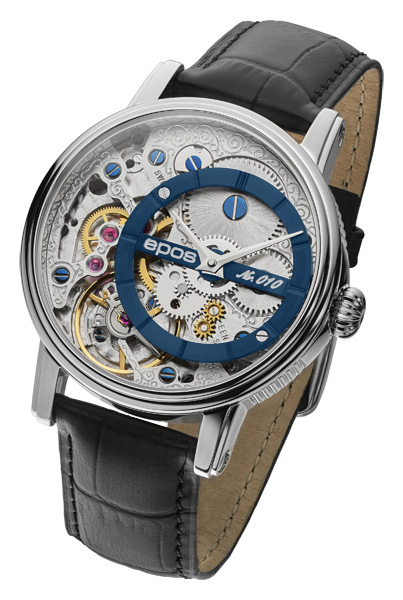
EPOS 3435 Verso, 2017.

Epos is a manufacturer of mechanical watches, headquartered in Lengnau, Switzerland.

== History ==
=== Early roots ===
The original company, which is told to be the ancestor of Epos, was founded in 1925 by James Aubert in Vallée de Joux. James was known at that time as a skillful engineer and craftsman devoting his lifetime to making and fixing complicated watch and clock mechanisms, e.g. chronographs and minute repeaters. Later, he handed down his watchmaking knowledge and expertise to Jean Aubert, his nephew, and his son-in-law Jean Fillon. With the passion inherited from James, Jean Fillon had led the firm forward for decades with remarkable innovations.

=== Reemerge and present day ===
During the quartz crisis, the Swiss traditional watchmaking industry faced enormous hardships. Many long-established companies went bankrupt, including the original James Aubert SA firm. It was not until the 1980s that the remaining assets of the firm was bought by Peter Hofer - an expert involved in the horological business for years. Based on the leftovers of the old company, he and his wife Erna founded Epos in 1983. In 2002, Ursula Forster and her husband Tamdi Chonge took over Epos as its owners and directors. In 2014, their son Singi Chonge assumed responsibility for the company as chairman of the board.

== Innovations ==
Among the company's innovations are:

- Epos 3400, 2010: First watch with a reversed 24-hour-indication for the second time-zone, including two separate mechanical movements.
- Epos 3435 'Verso', 2017: First watch with a reversed mechanical Unitas 6497 movement.

== Manufacture ==
The majority of Epos models are equipped with ETA and Sellita movements. Depending on each collection, the movements will be executed in different levels or tuned with special in-house developed complications. Other standard options including sapphire glass and high grade 316L stainless steel.

== Product lineups ==
Currently Epos offers collections under the names "Emotion", "Passion", "Originale", "Oeuvre D’Art", "Sophistiquée", "Perfection" and "Sportive". Further, the company also offers a "Ladies" and "Pocket Watch" collection.

== Brand Ambassadors ==
- Mauro Peter
- Bogusław Linda
- Gosia Rdest

== International presence ==
- The UK (Distributed by MODE9 (UK) Ltd.)
- Vietnam (Distributed by Dang Quang Online Services Jsc.)
