= ESDP =

The acronym ESDP may refer to:

- European Security and Defence Policy the former name of the European Union's Common Security and Defence Policy
- The European Spatial Development Planning network
- European Spatial Development Perspective
- Essential Skills Development Program at Humber College - Lakeshore Campus
- Enhanced Service Discovery Protocol - Bluetooth.org
- The Egyptian Social Democratic Party
