= Emerging issues analysis =

Alterarive Foresight Trends Analysis perspective

Emerging issues analysis (sometimes capitalized as Emerging Issues Analysis, and abbreviated as EIA) is a term used in futures studies and strategic planning, to describe the process of identifying and studying issues that have not been influential or important in the past, but that might be influential in the future. Since the issues identified in EIA are new, we cannot rely on their history to predict how they will influence the future. This distinguishes EIA from trend analysis. Trend analysis is used for issues where we have historical data that can be used to identify a trend, that can then be extrapolated to the future.

== See also ==
- Futures techniques
- Futures studies
- Scenario planning
- Strategic planning
