= EFF =

EFF or eff may refer to:

== Politics ==
- Economic Freedom Fighters, a South African far-left political party
- Economic Freedom Fund, an American political organization
- Election Fighting Fund, a British suffragist organization supporting the early Labour Party
- Electronic Frontier Foundation, a U.S.-based international digital rights group
- Evergreen Freedom Foundation, an American political think tank

== Other uses ==
- Eff (duo), a German musical duo
- Eff (programming language), a functional programming language with focus on algebraic effects
- Effective topos, a model of constructive mathematics based on computability
- Efficiency (basketball), a statistical benchmark
- Effingham Junction railway station, Surrey, England, a National Rail station code
- The Electronic Font Foundry, a British computer type foundry
- Emmett/Furla Films, now Emmett/Furla Oasis Films, an American production company
- Environmental Film Festival in the Nation's Capital, Washington, D.C., United States
- Ethiopian Football Federation, the governing body of association football in Ethiopia
- Extrusion freeform fabrication, a method for fabricating functionally graded material
- F, a letter of the alphabet
- A minced oath of the obscenity Fuck

== See also ==
- F (disambiguation)
