= Eastern Colleges Science Conference =

Annual academic conference

The Eastern Colleges Science Conference (ECSC) is an annual conference at which undergraduate students present the results of their research. ECSC is an interdisciplinary conference covering the fields of biology, chemistry, mathematics, physics engineering, computer science and behavioral sciences and was first organized in 1947. The conference is attended primarily by students enrolled in colleges located in the northeastern United States.
