= Equitorial Trust Bank =

- Type: Private
- Industry: Financial services
- Founded: 1990
- Headquarters: 1092 Adeola Odeku Street; Victoria Island; Lagos, Nigeria
- Products: Loans, Checking, Savings, Investments, Debit Cards, Credit Cards
- Website: Homepage

Equitorial Trust Bank Plc. (ETB), commonly referred to as Equitorial Bank, was a commercial bank in Nigeria. It was one of the twenty-six (26) commercial banks licensed by the Central Bank of Nigeria (CBN), the country's banking regulator, in early 2011 before a merger with Sterling Bank.

== Overview ==
ETB is a large financial services provider in Nigeria. As of January 2011, the bank maintained about one hundred (100) retail branches in various urban centers in the country.

== History ==
The bank was established in January 1990, as a limited liability company. In February the same year, it was granted a commercial banking license and in March 1990, it commenced banking operations. In 2006, ETB successfully merged with the former Devcom Bank. The bank is a national bank, which has most of its retail outlets located in Nigeria's major urban centers.

In 2009, in an audit by the Central Bank of Nigeria, ETB was found to be under-capitalized and unsatisfactorily managed. Subsequent to those discoveries, CBN directed ETB to reduce company staff numbers to maintain profitability. 150 staff members, representing about 15% of the bank's work force were fired in March 2010. ETB was also added to a list of nine (9) Nigerian commercial banks that required the injection of new capital by the Asset Management Company of Nigeria (AMCON), a federal government agency. ETB was taken over by Sterling bank in a deal that was sealed on 11 August 2011.

== Ownership ==
Prior to 2009, the shares of stock of the bank were privately owned. However, due to the intervention of the CBN and AMCON in 2009, a significant percentage of shareholding in ETB is owned by the Federal Government of Nigeria.

== See also ==
- List of banks in Nigeria
- Central Bank of Nigeria
- Economy of Nigeria
