= ETK v News Group Newspapers Ltd =

- Court: Court of Appeal of England and Wales
- Decided: 19 Apr 2011
- Citation: [2011] EWCA Civ 439
- Transcript

ETK v News Group Newspapers Ltd also known as K v News Group Newspapers Ltd [2011] EWCA Civ 439 was a 2011 Court of Appeal case in which a privacy injunction was obtained by a person in the British entertainment industry following an extra-marital affair.

== Facts ==
In November 2009, a well known entertainer began an affair with "X" who was working for the same company. The entertainer's wife found out causing him to end the relationship with "X" in an attempt to save the marriage. In December 2010, "X" was informed that she would no longer be needed at the company and news of this leaked to "D". The entertainer applied for an injunction to prevent publication.
