= EMP1 =

Protein-coding gene in humans

Identifiers
- Aliases: EMP1, CL-20, EMP-1, TMP, epithelial membrane protein 1
- External IDs: OMIM: 602333; MGI: 107941; HomoloGene: 1088; GeneCards: EMP1; OMA:EMP1 - orthologs

Gene location (Human)
Chr.	Chromosome 12 (human)
Band	12p13.1	Start	13,196,723 bp
Band	12p13.1	End	13,219,941 bp

Gene location (Mouse)
Chr.	Chromosome 6 (mouse)
Band	6 G1|6 66.25 cM	Start	135,339,543 bp
Band	6 G1|6 66.25 cM	End	135,360,171 bp
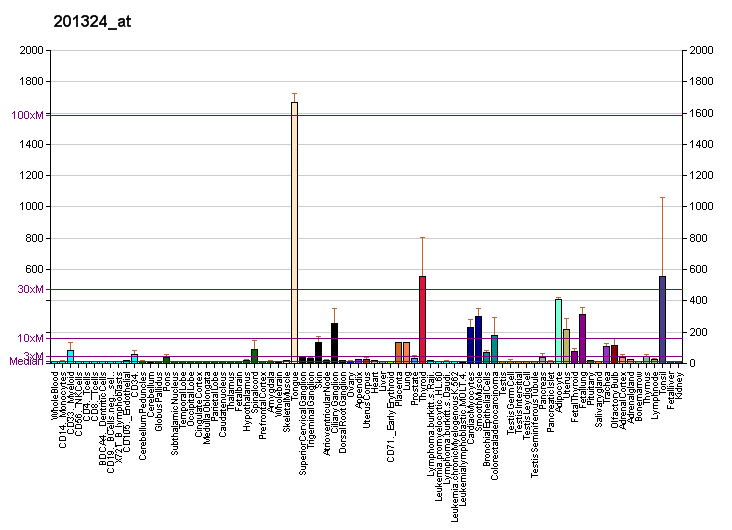

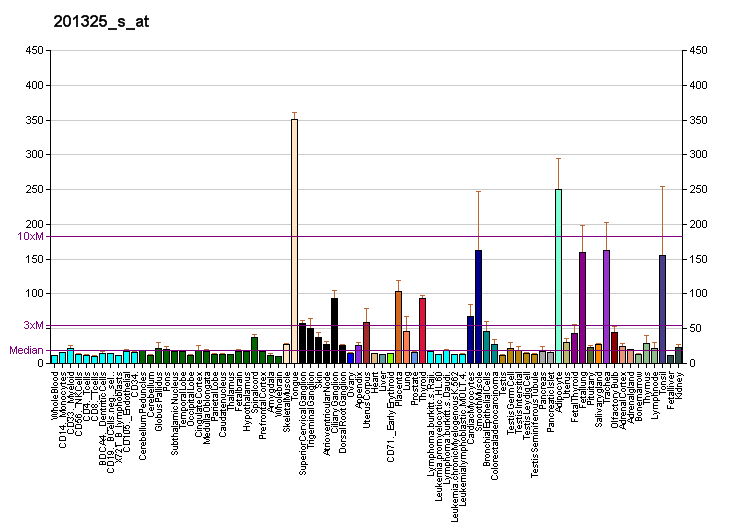

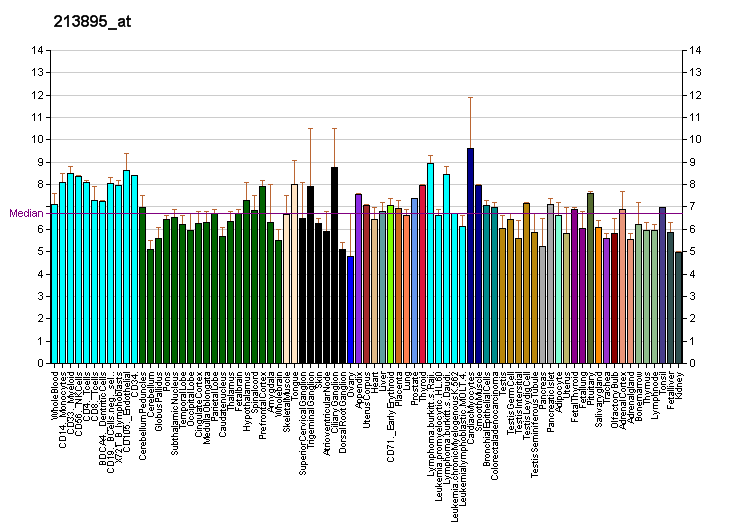
RNA expression pattern
Bgee	Human / Mouse (ortholog); Top expressed in: mucosa of pharynx; oral cavity; amniotic fluid; synovial joint; body of tongue; gums; gingival epithelium; buccal mucosa cell; skin of hip; stromal cell of endometrium / Top expressed in: corneal stroma; conjunctival fornix; umbilical cord; skin of external ear; ankle joint; left lung lobe; skin of back; stroma of bone marrow; dermis; sciatic nerve; More reference expression data
BioGPS	More reference expression data
Gene ontology
Molecular function	protein binding
Cellular component	plasma membrane; membrane; integral component of membrane
Biological process	multicellular organism development; bleb assembly; cell population proliferation; cell death; epidermis development
Sources:Amigo / QuickGO
Orthologs
Species	Human	Mouse
Entrez	2012	13730
Ensembl	ENSG00000134531	ENSMUSG00000030208
UniProt	P54849	P47801
RefSeq (mRNA)	NM_001423	NM_001288627; NM_001288628; NM_010128
RefSeq (protein)	NP_001414	NP_001275556; NP_001275557; NP_034258
Location (UCSC)	Chr 12: 13.2 – 13.22 Mb	Chr 6: 135.34 – 135.36 Mb
PubMed search
- Wikidata
View/Edit Human	View/Edit Mouse

Epithelial membrane protein 1 is a protein that in humans is encoded by the EMP1 gene.
