= EEC (disambiguation) =

EEC is the European Economic Community, a regional organisation that existed from 1958 to 1993.

EEC may also refer to:

- Eastern Economic Corridor, Thailand
- East European craton
- Easwari Engineering College, in Chennai, India
- Ectrodactyly–ectodermal dysplasia–cleft syndrome
- Embodied embedded cognition
- Enterprise Electronics Corporation, an American weather radar company
- Eswatini Electricity Company, the national electricity supplier in Eswatini
- Eurasian Economic Commission, the regulatory body of the Eurasian Economic Union
- Eurasian Economic Community, an international organisation that existed from 2000 to 2014
- European Energy Centre
- European Energy Community, the former name for the Energy Community
- Extended Error Correction, a RAM parity feature
- Ford EEC, a series of engine control units
- Electronic engine control, an element of a full authority digital engine control
