= World Electric Vehicle Association =

International electric vehicle organization

World Electric Vehicle Association WEVA
- Website: worldelectricvehicleassociation.info

The World Electric Vehicle Association (WEVA) is an organization that promotes electric vehicles.

== Member associations ==
It is composed of:

- The Electric Drive Transportation Association (EDTA).
- The Electric Vehicle Association of Asia Pacific (EVAAP).
- The European Association for Battery, Hybrid and Fuel Cell Electric Vehicles (AVERE).

=== EDTA ===
The Electric Drive Transportation Association (EDTA) is the American branch, based in Washington, D.C.

Founded in 1989, the EDTA is a US industry association that advocates for electric drive transportation technologies through education, industry networking, public policy advocacy and international conferences and exhibitions.

=== EVAAP ===
The Electric Vehicle Association of Asia Pacific (EVAAP) is an international organization that promotes the use of electric vehicles in the Asia and the Pacific and also representative to the World Electric Vehicle Association (WEVA) organizing the International Electric Vehicle Symposium (EVS) rotationally with AVERE and EDTA.

=== AVERE ===
The European Association for Battery, Hybrid and Fuel Cell Electric Vehicles (AVERE) was founded in 1978 and is based in Brussels, Belgium. It is a European network of users, NGO's, associations, interest groups, etc. Its main objective is promoting the use of battery, hybrid and fuel cell electric vehicles (individually and in fleets) for priority uses in order to achieve a greener mobility for cities and countries.

==== Structure ====
Component	Description
National Associations	17 member organizations
European networks	CITELEC and Eurelectric
Direct members	Over 1000 direct and indirect members

==== Activities ====
Activity	Description
Dissemination	Promoting the use of battery, hybrid and fuel cell electric vehicles
Networking	Connecting with users, NGOs, associations, interest groups, etc.
Monitoring	Keeping track of developments in the electric drive industry and R&D
Participation in projects	Joining European and multilateral projects
Lobbying	Advocating for the concerns of the electric drive industry and R&D bodies to the European Commission
Research and development	Advancing the development of clean vehicles
Electric Vehicle Symposiums (EVS)	Organizing EVS conferences as a part of WEVA
Collaborating in events	Participating in regional events in different countries and specialized conferences and workshops

== World Electric Vehicle Journal (WEVJ) ==
WEVA publishes an international scientific journal called the World Electric Vehicle Journal. The World Electric Vehicle Journal is a peer-reviewed international scientific journal that covers all studies related to battery, hybrid and fuel cell electric vehicles comprehensively. It publishes selected contributions from the EVS Symposia after an additional review process.

== See also ==
- CalCars
- Electric vehicle
- Japan Automobile Research Institute (JARI)
- Repower America
