= Effects-based operations =

United States military concept

Effects-based operations (EBO) is a United States military concept that emerged during the Persian Gulf War for the planning and conduct of operations combining military and non-military methods to achieve a particular effect. An effects-based approach to operations was first applied in modern times in the design and execution of the Desert Storm air campaign of 1991. The principal author of the daily attack plans—then Lt Colonel, now retired Lt General David A. Deptula—used an effects-based approach in building the actual Desert Storm air campaign targeting plan. Deptula describes the background, rationale, and provides an example of how an effects-based approach to targeting was conducted in Desert Storm in the publication, "Effects-Based Operations: Change in the Nature of Warfare." The doctrine was developed with an aim of putting desired strategic effects first and then planning from the desired strategic objective back to the possible tactical level actions that could be taken to achieve the desired effect. Contrary to conventional military approaches of force-on-force application that focused on attrition and annihilation, EBO focused on desired outcomes attempting to use a minimum of force. The approach was enabled by advancements in weaponry—particularly stealth and precision weapons—in conjunction with a planning approach based on specific effects rather than absolute destruction. Deptula, speaking at the Gulf War Air Campaign Tenth Anniversary Retrospective, on 17 January 2001 on One Massachusetts Avenue, NW, Washington, DC, defined the goal of EBO; "If we focus on effects, the end of strategy, rather than force-on-force the traditional means to achieve it militarily, that enables us to consider different and perhaps more effective ways to accomplish the same goal quicker than in the past, with fewer resources and most importantly with fewer casualties." Others have postulated that EBO could be interpreted as an emerging understanding that attacking a second-order target may have first order consequences for a variety of objectives, wherein the Commander's intent can be satisfied with a minimum of collateral damage or risk to his own forces.

EBO is not just an emerging concept—it was the basis of the Desert Storm air campaign plan. However, over the years since, multiple views have emerged on what it meant and how it could be implemented. Most notably, military scientists at the Air Force Research Lab, the Army Research Lab and DARPA engaged in research to develop automated tools to annotate options and recommend courses of action. This is hard science and tools are slow to be implemented. For air forces, it supported the ability for a single aircraft to attack multiple targets, unlike tactics of previous wars, which used multiple aircraft to attack single targets, usually to create destruction without thought of later re-use by allied forces or friendly civilians.

While technological capabilities can facilitate an effects-based approach to operations, emphasizing tools and tactics miss the fact EBO is a methodology or a way of thinking—it is not a fixed set of tactics, techniques, and procedures. An effects-based approach starts with the end-game of action as the starting point in planning the appropriate application of each of the elements of security—diplomatic, information, military, and economic—to reach the desired end-state. Accordingly, EBO concepts traditionally take a "systemic approach" to security challenges, evaluating the situation through the lens of strategic centers of gravity—leadership; key essentials; infrastructure; population; and military forces. Each of these strategic centers of gravity can be decomposed into operational centers of gravity, and each of those into tactical centers of gravity. EBO is an approach that looks at the totality of the system being acted upon and determining what are the most effective means to achieve the desired end state.

In 2008, Joint Forces Command stopped using the term "effects-based" after failure of the Army-led TEBO JCTD. However, the concept remains valid in, and used by all, the military services. On 31 August 2011, Joint Forces Command was officially disestablished.

== Definition ==
As defined by the United States Joint Forces Command (USJFCOM), effects-based operations are "a process for obtaining a desired strategic outcome or effect on the enemy through the synergistic and cumulative application of the full range of military and nonmilitary capabilities at all levels of conflict". The intent and desired outcome of an effects-based approach is to employ forces that paralyze the enemy forces and minimize its ability to engage friendly forces in close combat.

Rather than focusing specifically on causing casualties and physical destruction resulting in the attrition or annihilation of enemy forces, effects-based operations emphasizes end-state goals first, and then focuses on the means available to achieve those goals. For instance, psychological operations, electronic warfare, logistical disruptions and other non-lethal means can be used to achieve the demoralization or defeat of an enemy force while minimizing civilian casualties or avoiding the destruction of infrastructure. While effects-based operations does not rule out lethal operations, it places them as options in a series of operational choices for military commanders.

=== Batschelet's Seven attributes of EBO ===
JFCOM's description of the doctrine is quoted by LTC (now MG) Allen Batschelet, author of the April 2002 study Effects-based operations: A New Operational Model? He was later appointed in 2004 as commander of the Fires Brigade, the newly reorganized 4th Infantry Division Artillery Brigade which deployed to Iraq to implement such theories in practice.

According to Batschelet's paper, seven elements comprise and differentiate EBO:

1. Focus on Decision Superiority
2. Applicability in Peace and War (Full-Spectrum Operations)
3. Focus Beyond Direct, Immediate First-Order Effects
4. Understanding of the Adversary's Systems
5. Ability of Disciplined Adaptation
6. Application of the Elements of National Power
7. Ability of Decision-Making to Adapt Rules and Assumptions to Reality

=== Center of gravity ===
The core of the doctrine, to support superior decision-making and to understand the enemy's systems, lies in determining and calculating the philosophical (not physical) center of gravity (COG) of the combatants. "COGs are those characteristics, capabilities, or localities from which a military derives its freedom of action, physical strength, or will to fight" (such as leadership, system essentials, infrastructure, population, and field military). A similar modeling scheme refers to these as National Elements of Value (NEV). A relative weighting is made as to which of the elements are most critical to be targeted by operations.

== Effects-based thinking ==
EBO is less of a thing and more of a mindset. Except in cases where this developer or that has sought to use the term for their software application, EBO does not replace existing systems or core concepts. EBO is instead:

- a fully developed theory grounded in effects-based thinking;
- a process to facilitate development of an organizational culture of EBO processes; and
- a lexicon that promotes understanding through a common language.

EBO seeks to understand the causal linkages between events, actions and results. EBO is most useful in understanding secondary and tertiary consequences to actions. For example, the effect of feeding a hungry child could be accomplished by handing the child a meal, directing the child and/or guardian to a soup kitchen or food pantry, or by providing the child or the guardian a job as a means to earn sufficient ongoing income to afford daily meals.

== EBO in practice ==
Although it was not called EBO at the time, the strategic bombing of Nazi rail lines from the manufacturing centers in Normandy to the interior of Germany disrupted critical resupply channels, weakening Germany's ability to maintain an effective war effort. Removing a few key bridges had the same effect as large-scale bombing.

The first examples of consciously using effects-based approach of limited military actions to create strategic effects with little collateral damage occurred during the Operation Desert Storm air campaign, where a very limited number of bombs were used against Iraq air defense command and control centers. The measure of effectiveness used to determine success of the attacks was not whether all the facilities were destroyed, but whether they were actually performing their intended function. This example and others are completely described in "Effects-Based Operations: Change in the Nature of Warfare." Another example is when the US dropped CBU-94B anti-electrical cluster bombs filled with 147 reels of fine conductive fiber. These were employed on high-voltage electrical transmission lines leading to Serbia to short them and "knock the lights out." On the first attack, these knocked out 70% of the electrical power supply, crippling the enemy's command and control and air defense networks.

During the first Gulf War in 1990 and 91, USAF Lt Colonel (now Retired Lt General) Dave Deptula argued against the dominant view of targeting for destruction, instead opting for alternate and unconventional means to achieve desired effects. For example, as chief air power planner, he chose to target the Iraqi air defenses first, removing opposition that would have kept subsequent missions from creating effective precision attacks. This allowed him to achieve desired effects with far fewer munitions, reserving those critical assets for future missions.

The January–February 2004 issue of Field Artillery magazine featured a report on the implementation of Effects-Based Operations in Afghanistan "to help shape an environment that enables the reconstruction of the country as a whole." United States policy objectives are to create a "government of Afghanistan committed to and capable of preventing the re-emergence of terrorism on Afghan soil." All mission efforts are undertaken with that end-state goal in mind. To coordinate endeavors, the US military maintains a Joint Effects Coordination Board (JECB) chaired by the Director of the Combined/Joint Staff (DCJS) which serves to select and synchronize targets and determine desired effects across branches and operational units. Besides representatives from combat maneuver organizations, staff also is drawn from the Staff Judge Advocate (SJA), Psychological Operations (PSYOP) and Public Affairs (PA). Weekly Joint Effects Working Group (JEWG) targeting team meetings provide recommendations and updates to the JECB based on three priorities:

- Enable Afghan institutions
- Assist in removing the causes of instability
- Deny the enemy sanctuary and counter terrorism.

The result is a three-week-ahead planning window, or battle rhythm, to produce the desired effects of the commanders, as defined in operations orders (OPORDs) every three weeks and fragmentary orders (FRAGOs) each week to update the standing OPORDs. Activities include both lethal and non-lethal missions, including civil-military, public affairs, reconstruction, intelligence and psychological operations and feedback as well as conventional combat and fire support missions.

An FA lieutenant, as an "Effects Support Team" (EST) leader, must understand how to employ lethal and non-lethal assets to realize the maneuver company commander's vision of future operations. He must be able to work with civil affairs teams, special operations, coalition and host-nation forces, as well as NGOs and OGAs.

This requires a shift away from "hot steel" (artillery fire) as a solution to all problems, and a focus on integration of multiple dimensions and methods to achieve desired results.

A study in 2008 concluded that a contributing factor to the Israeli Defense Force's defeat in the Israeli-Hezbollah Conflict in the Summer of 2006 was due in large part to an over reliance on EBO concepts. However, contrary to this opinion, Dag Henriksen, PhD, Royal Norwegian Air Force Academy, highlights the reality that "the absence of a clearly identified military strategy for war or of one's objectives reduces the relevance of the concept of EBO—or, indeed, of any military concept. In other words, if you do not know where you are going, the means to get there is hardly the key problem. Thus, one risks cherry-picking the variable (in this case EBO) that actually played a subordinate role in the negative outcome for the Israel Defense Forces (IDF) during this conflict. Logically, these factors render this particular conflict largely unsuitable as an empirical foundation for harshly criticizing EBO." Henriksen's study finds that the Israeli campaign in 2006 does not provide sufficient empirical evidence of flaws in EBO.

== EBO In and Out of Favor ==
In 2008, Joint Forces Command, then caretaker of U.S. Military Joint Warfighting doctrine, noted the failure of US Army's Theater EBO software development and issued memorandum and a guidance documents from then commander, Marine General James Mattis, on Effects Based Operations. In these documents dated 14 August 2008 Mattis said, "Effective immediately, USJFCOM will no longer use, sponsor or export the terms and concepts related to EBO ... in our training, doctrine development and support of JPME (Joint Professional Military Education)." Mattis went on to say, "... we must recognize that the term "effects-based" is fundamentally flawed, has far too many interpretations and is at odds with the very nature of war to the point it expands confusion and inflates a sense of predictability far beyond that which it can be expected to deliver." The Mattis directive did not distinguish between various versions of EBO within the United States military, but it did state that the memorandum does not address the NATO version of EBO—implying that the reason is because "NATO's policy focuses on the whole of government/Comprehensive Approach. Since the release of the Mattis EBO memo, he has reportedly indicated that the intent was not to make an assessment of the Air Force version of EBO, so the critical assessment seems to be levied against a brand of EBO taught by his command.

Coming from the commander of the one command (U.S. Joint Forces Command) that was supposed to be the advocate for innovative ways to conduct warfare, the Mattis order to ban the use of the term "effects-based" was odd, and some have characterized it as similar to "book burning" to stem the spread of ideas.

Dag Henriksen, PhD, Royal Norwegian Air Force Academy, observes regarding the Mattis action, "Debating EBO without acknowledging the more general challenges of strategic thinking in the wars portrayed by General Mattis and others as empirical evidence of the flaws of that concept is somewhat intellectually dishonest and analytically misguided. Including the overarching issues of military strategy would prove beneficial to both the EBO debate and—more importantly—the more general discussion about the utility of force."

EBO has not been abandoned as an operating concept in the U.S. military. It is mentioned 124 times in Joint Publication 5–0, Planning of Joint Operations. The U.S. Air Force has actually increased mention of 'effects-based' thinking in official doctrine and has codified it in AF Doctrine Document 2. Lt Gen (Ret) Deptula makes the point that EBO is not service specific at all, and states, that "EBO can be a springboard for the better linking of military, economic, information, and diplomatic instruments of power to conduct security strategy in depth. The challenge lies in understanding and developing the potential of an effects-based approach to operations. Resistance to this kind of approach may be warranted when individuals mischaracterize EBO as (1) requiring complete knowledge of an adversary's intentions, (2) discounting the enemy's human dimension, and (3) being overly dependent on centralization to succeed. With an accurate understanding of the intent of EBO, none of these assertions has any validity."

Colonels Carpenter and Andrews, writing in Joint Forces Quarterly noted "When EBO has been misunderstood, overextended, or misapplied in exercises, it has primarily been through misapplication or over-engineering, not because of EBO principles themselves. Specifically, the bundling of ONA and SoSA with EBO weighed down a useful concept with an unworkable software engineering approach to war."

== See also ==
- Psyops
- Military operations other than war
- Intent (Military)
