= Ethnic power relations =

The ethnic power relations (EPR) dataset identifies all politically relevant ethnic groups, their size, and their access to state power in every country of the world with a population of at least 250,000 from 1946 to 2017. It includes annual data on over 800 groups and codes the degree to which their representatives hold executive-level state power, from total control of the government, power-sharing to overt political discrimination. Also, it provides information on regional autonomy arrangements.

The EPR data is maintained by researchers at the Chair of International Conflict Research at ETH Zurich. The current version of the EPR data is available in research-ready country-year and group-year format from the GROWup Research Front-End data portal.

In contrast to similar datasets, such as Minorities At Risk (MAR), the EPR list includes minority and majority groups. The EPR data is one of the most widely used datasets on ethnic groups in social sciences. Google Scholar lists 1035 references to the EPR.

== EPR dataset family ==
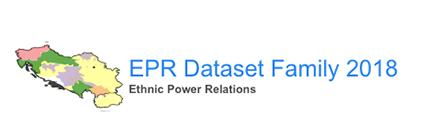

In addition to ethnic power relations, the EPR dataset family includes information on ethnic groups' settlement patterns, links to rebel organizations, transborder ethnic kin relations, ethnic refugee groups, and intraethnic cleavages.

== Expert survey ==
The EPR data is composed on the basis of an online expert survey. Nearly one hundred country and regional experts were asked to identify the ethnic categories most salient for national politics in each country.
