= EQ3 =

EQ3 may refer to:

- EQ3, a furniture brand from Palliser Furniture
- EQ3, a predictive text input method
- Sky-Watcher EQ3, a telescope equatorial mount
- Chery eQ3, an electric car version of the Chery QQ3

== See also ==
- EQ (disambiguation)
- Q3 (disambiguation)
- E3 (disambiguation)
- 3 (disambiguation)
