= EES =

EES may refer to:

== Government ==
- Entry/Exit System, a biometric EU entry system
- European Economic Senate, business association
- European Employment Strategy

== Places ==
- Ees (place name), an archaic term for water meadows or firm land adjacent to streams or fens
- Ees, Drenthe, a village in the Netherlands
- Eys (Limburgish: Ees), a village in Limburg, Netherlands

== Science and medicine ==
- Egypt Exploration Society, an archeological society
- Endoscopic ear surgery
- Energy & Environmental Science, a scholarly journal
- Environmental engineering science
- Epidural electrical stimulator, a type of spinal cord stimulator
- Ethinylestradiol sulfonate, estrogen medication
- Extended evolutionary synthesis

== Technology ==
- Engineering Equation Solver, a thermodynamics software package

== Other uses ==
- EES (rapper) (born 1983), Namibian musician
- Electric Eel Shock, a Japanese rock band
- Enron Energy Services, an American energy distribution company

== See also ==
- ES (disambiguation)
- EE (disambiguation)
