= E3 series =

E3 series may refer to:

- E3 series (preferred numbers), a series of standardized resistor and capacitor values
- E3 series (train), a Japanese Shinkansen train since 1997

== See also ==
- E3 (disambiguation)
