= Triple E =

Triple E may refer to:

- Maersk Triple E class, a class of container ship
- Embrace, extend and extinguish, business tactic used by Microsoft
- Triple-E Senate (elected, effective, equal), a proposal for senate reform in Canada
- Triple E Recreational Vehicles, Canadian RV company
- Eastern equine encephalitis virus (Triple E)
- Education, Ethics, and Entertainment (Triple E + Engagement) proposed by Robert L. Selman

== Other uses ==
- EEE (disambiguation)
- 3E (disambiguation)
- E3 (disambiguation)
- IEEE (usually pronounced "I triple E")
