= Q3 =

Q3 or Q-3 may refer to:

== Transportation ==
- Zambian Airways, IATA airline code Q3
- Audi Q3, a subcompact luxury crossover SUV produced from 2011
- Q3 (New York City bus), a bus line in New York City
- QuayCity Q3, a bus in Newcastle, UK

== Other ==
- The third quarter of a fiscal year
- The third quarter of a calendar year
- The third quartile, in descriptive statistics
- The third quarto edition of William Shakespeare's Titus Andronicus
- Quake III Arena, a 1999 multi-platform video game
- Haplogroup Q3 (Y-DNA), a Y-chromosome DNA haplogroup
- Q_{3}, a field of p-adic numbers in mathematics
- Q3 was a British Puppetry company that produced the models used in Fingerbobs
- Q3, a production duo consisting of Jabari Manwa and Isaiah "Kiko Merley" Merriweather from Brockhampton (band)
- Quran 3, the 3rd chapter of the Islamic Holy book
- Q3 Academy (disambiguation)

== See also ==
- 3Q (disambiguation)
