= Q3 Academy =

Q3 Academy is the name of three secondary schools located in the West Midlands of England:

- Q3 Academy Great Barr
- Q3 Academy Langley
- Q3 Academy Tipton

== See also ==
- Q3 (disambiguation)
