= 3E =

3E or 3-E may refer to:

- 3e, general entertainment channel in Ireland
- 3rd meridian east
- Third edition in the Editions of Dungeons & Dragons
- NY 3E, alternate name for New York State Route 104
- OK-3E, abbreviation for Oklahoma State Highway 3
- 3E, a model of Toyota E engine
- 3^{e}, an abbreviation for 3ème, the third ordinal number in the French language
- 3Ε (Tria Epsilon), an abbreviation for the Coca-Cola Hellenic Bottling Company (Greek: Coca-Cola Ελληνική Εταιρεία Εμφιαλώσεως)

== See also ==
- E3 (disambiguation)
- EEE (disambiguation)
- Triple E (disambiguation)
