= EEE =

EEE may refer to:

== Business ==
- Electronic Equipment Engineering, a defunct American trade magazine
- Embrace, extend and extinguish, an anti-competitive Microsoft business strategy
- Coca-Cola Hellenic Bottling Company (trades as EEE)
- Union of Greek Shipowners

== Computing ==
- Asus Eee, a family of computer products
- Energy-Efficient Ethernet, a standard by the IEEE 802.3az group
- Embrace, extend, and extinguish, a phrase found by the US Department of Justice in use internally by Microsoft for its business strategy

== Science and medicine ==
- EEE (psychedelic), a drug
- Eastern equine encephalitis (EEE), also referred to as 'Triple E'
- Earthquake environmental effects

== Other uses ==
- E language, spoken in China (ISO 639-3 code: eee)
- Electronic and electrical engineering
- "Electrical and electronic equipment", a phrase associated with the EU Waste Electrical and Electronic Equipment Directive
- Ed, Edd n Eddy, an animated Cartoon Network television series created by Danny Antonucci
- National Union of Greece (Ethniki Enosis Ellados), a defunct far-right political party in Greece
- Triple-E Senate, a proposal for restructuring the Senate of Canada
- EEE, a width or girth in shoe size
- Terror of the Autons, a 1971 Doctor Who serial (production code "EEE")

== See also ==
- 3E (disambiguation)
- E3 (disambiguation)
- EE (disambiguation)
- Triple E (disambiguation)
