= EE =

EE, Ee or ee may refer to:

== People, arts, and media ==
- Ee Peng Liang, Singaporean businessman
- Annie Ee Yu Lian, Singaporean abuse and murder victim
- Ee Lee, Hmong American murder victim
- E. E. Cummings, American poet
- Ee (band), American indie-rock band
- E.E. (novel), a 1995 psychological novel by the Polish author Olga Tokarczuk

== Language ==
- ee, an English language digraph
  - -ee, a suffix for an object of a verb
- Ewe language (ISO 639-1 code EE)

== Places ==
- Ee (island), an island in the Cook Islands
- Estonia (ISO country code EE)
  - .ee, the ccTLD of Estonia
- Ie, Noardeast-Fryslân, Netherlands (formerly Ee)

== Science and technology ==
=== Computing, electronics, and engineering ===
- Google Earth Engine, a GIS cloud computing platform
- Easy Editor, a text editor for the BSD computer operating system
- Execution environment, the context in which a program runs
- Jakarta EE, formerly Java EE, a set of specifications extending Java SE
- End entity, a client communicating with certificate authority by means of Certificate Management Protocol
- Emotion Engine, the CPU in PlayStation 2 game consoles
- The English Electric Company Limited, a British-based industrial manufacturer of electrical components
- EE (telecommunications), a British telecommunications company
- El Paso Electric, a public utility company trading as EE on the New York Stock Exchange
- EE (calculator key) (enter exponent), to enter numbers in scientific or engineering notation
- Electronics engineering
- Electrical engineering
- Environmental engineering

=== Biology, medicine, and chemistry ===
- Environmental enteropathy, in medicine, is a condition believed to be due to frequent intestinal infections
- Eosinophilic esophagitis, an allergic gastrointestinal disorder
- Ethylmalonic encephalopathy, a genetic disorder
- Expressed emotion, in psychology
- Estradiol enanthate, an estrogen which is used in combined injectable birth control
- Ethinylestradiol, an estrogen which is used in combined birth control pills
- Enantiomeric excess, in chemistry
- Ethoxyethyl ethers, a protecting group in chemistry

== Transportation and sports ==
- Aero Airlines, IATA airline code EE
- EE (Eighth Avenue Local), a variant of the New York City Subway service E
- EE (Queens-Broadway Local), a New York City Subway service route from Forest Hills to Whitehall Street, merged into the N in 1976
- Extreme E, an electric offroad rally racing series
- Edmonton Elks, a Canadian Football League franchise based in Edmonton, Alberta

== Other uses ==
- EE, a North American standard shoe width, based on the Brannock Device's sizing system
- EE, a brassiere cup size
- Entente Européenne d'Aviculture et de Cuniculture, also known as the Entente Européenne (EE) or the European Association of Poultry, Pigeon, Cage Bird, Rabbit and Cavy Breeders
- Evangelism Explosion, a Christian evangelistic discipleship ministry and training program

== See also ==
- EES (disambiguation)
- EEE (disambiguation)
- E (disambiguation)
- E2 (disambiguation)
- EEC
