= 3Q =

3Q or 3-Q may refer to:

- 3Q, IATA airline code for China Yunnan Airlines
- The third quarter of a fiscal year
- The third quarter of a calendar year
- 3Q, designation for one of the Qumran Caves
- 3Q (san Q), an informal slang used in both Mandarin and Japanese to express gratitude, is a phonetic representation of the English phrase "Thank you."
- 3q, an arm of Chromosome 3 (human)

== See also ==
- Q3 (disambiguation)
