= Ees (place name) =

Ees (plural of ee) is an archaic English term for a piece of land liable to flood, or water meadow. It is derived from the Anglo-Saxon ¯eg (or ¯ieg) meaning "'island', also used of a piece of firm land in a fen and of land situated on a stream or between streams". It is still used locally in Greater Manchester to indicate former water meadows and flood basins adjoining the River Mersey: Chorlton Ees, Sale Ees and Stretford Ees. In the Lake District there are Ees and Strickland Ees on Esthwaite Water. The term is also modified to "eye" and "eea" in the name of Park Eye (or Park Eea) and Woolston Eyes.
