= Audi Q3 =

Subcompact luxury crossover SUV produced by Audi

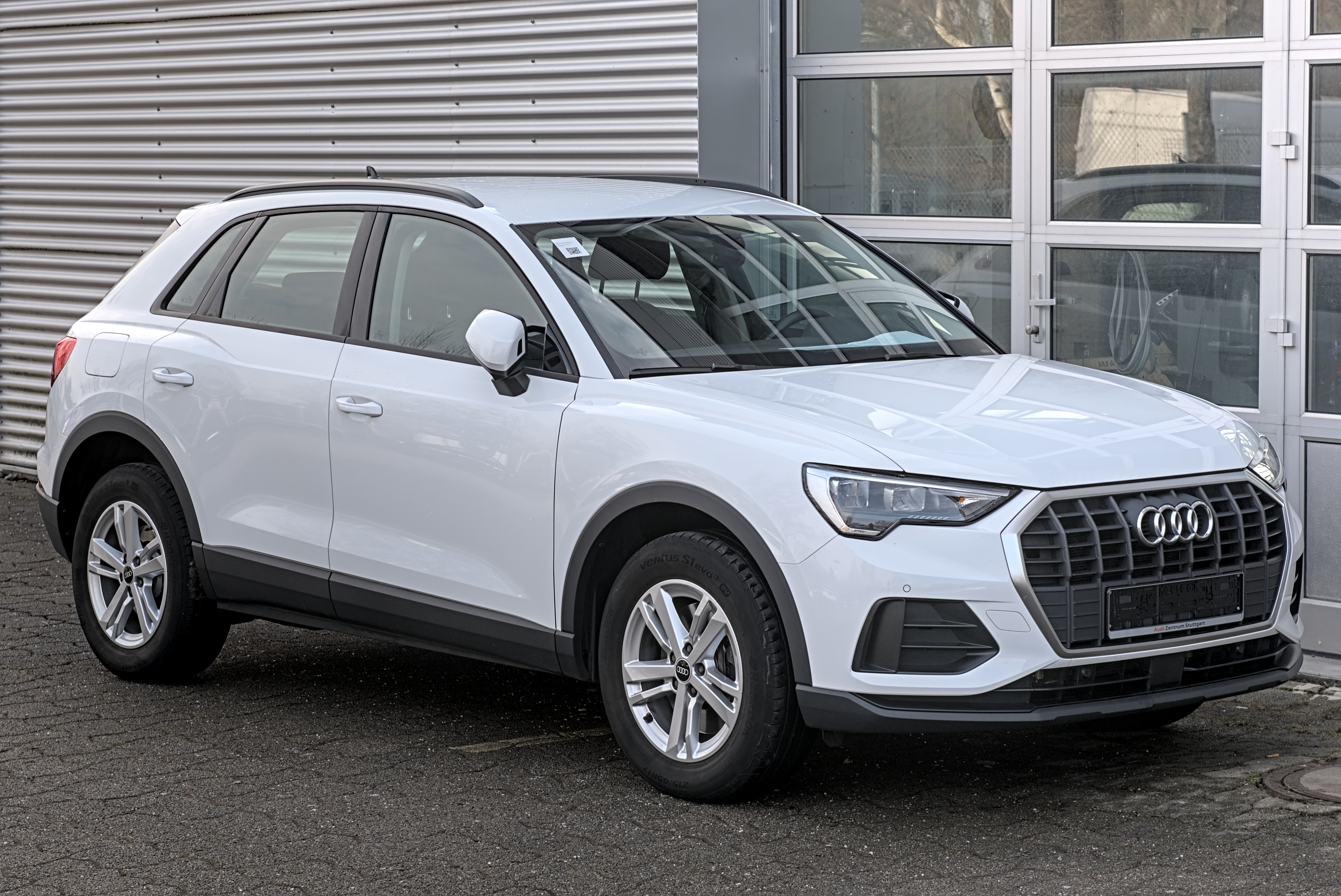

Overview
- Manufacturer: Audi AG
- Production: 2011–present
- Model years: 2012–present 2015–present (North America)

Body and chassis
- Class: Subcompact luxury crossover SUV
- Layout: Front-engine, front-wheel-drive Front-engine, four-wheel-drive (quattro)

The Audi Q3 is a subcompact luxury crossover SUV produced by Audi since 2011. The Q3 has a transverse-mounted front engine. It was unveiled in April 2007 at the Shanghai motor show. A coupe SUV variant has been produced since the second generation, called the Q3 Sportback.

Since the discontinuation of the Audi A1 and Audi Q2 in 2026, the Q3 is Audi's smallest combustion engine model, alongside the Audi A3.

== First generation (Typ 8U; 2011) ==
First generation
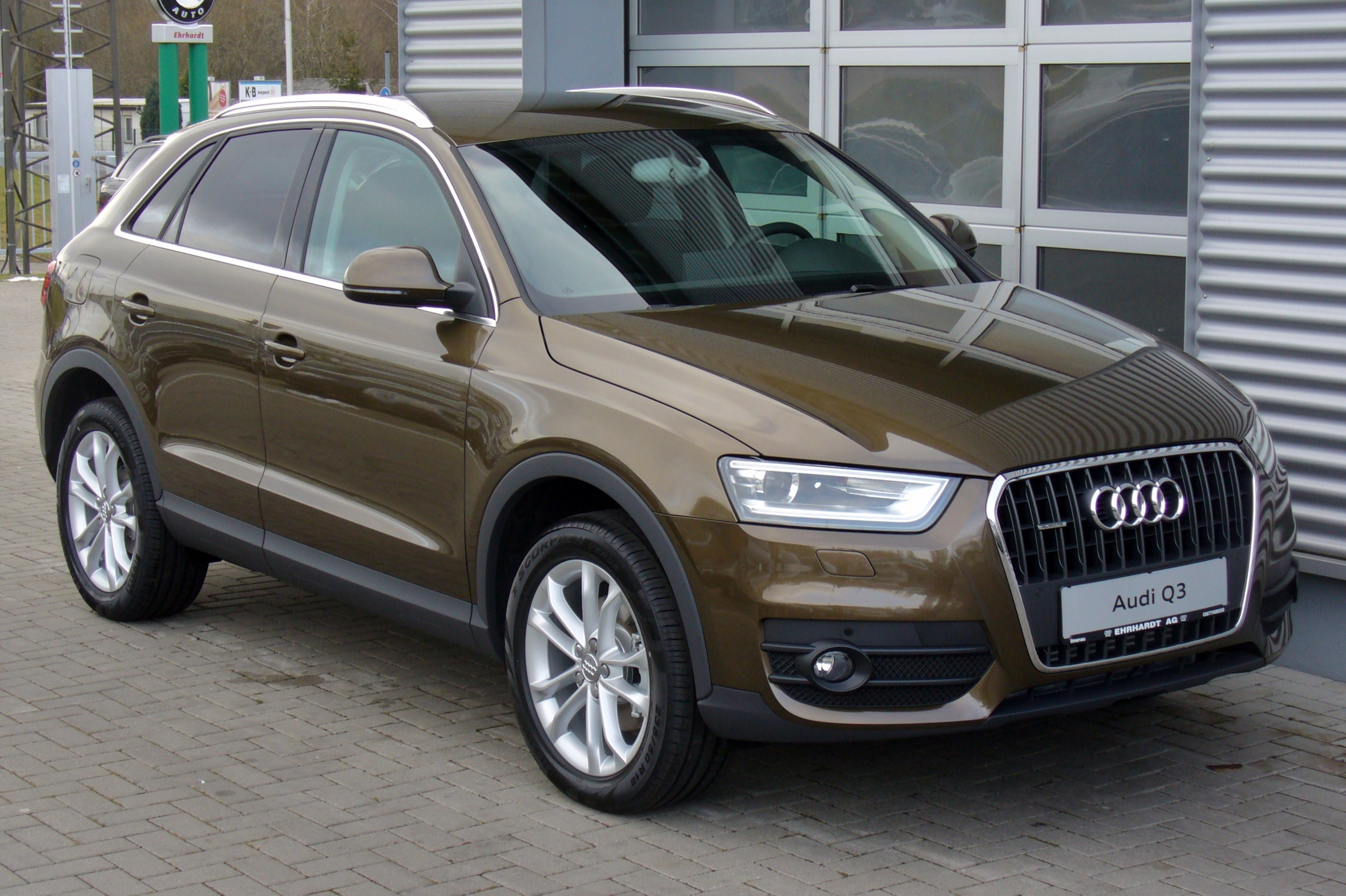

Overview
- Model code: 8U
- Production: June 2011–2018
- Model years: 2012–2018; 2015–2018 (North America)
- Assembly: Spain: Martorell (SEAT S.A.); China: Changchun (FAW-VW); India: Pune (Škoda Auto Volkswagen India); Brazil: Curitiba (Volkswagen Brazil)
- Designer: Julian Hönig (Concept: 2006; Production: 2009)

Body and chassis
- Body style: 5-door SUV
- Layout: Front-engine, front-wheel drive / all-wheel drive
- Platform: Volkswagen Group A5 (PQ35)
- Related: Volkswagen Tiguan; Škoda Yeti

Powertrain
- Engine: Petrol: 1.4L Volkswagen EA211 TFSI I4; 2.0L Volkswagen EA888 TFSI I4; 2.5L Volkswagen EA855 TFSI I5; Diesel: 2.0L Volkswagen EA189 TDI I4
- Transmission: 6-speed manual 6-speed automatic (North America); 6-speed S-Tronic (1.4 TFSI); 7-speed S-Tronic

Dimensions
- Wheelbase: 2,603 mm (102.5 in)
- Length: 4,385 mm (172.6 in)
- Width: 1,831 mm (72.1 in)
- Height: 1,608 mm (63.3 in)

=== Concept Vehicle: Audi Cross Coupé quattro (2007) ===
Designed by Julian Hoenig in 2006, it was a concept vehicle with Liquid Silver body colour, 20-inch wheels, fabric folding roof, electrically controlled hood, 4-cylinder 2.0 TDI engine rated at 204 PS (150 kW; 201 hp) and 400 N⋅m (295.02 lbf⋅ft), diesel particulate filter and Bluetec emission control system, quattro permanent four-wheel drive system with Haldex clutch, Audi S tronic dual-clutch gearbox, MacPherson strut front axle and a four-link rear axle, Audi drive select system with 3 modes (dynamic, sport, efficiency), MMI control panel with touch pad and dual-view technology, sound system with the prominent extending tweeters.

The vehicle was unveiled at the Shanghai Motor Show in April 2007.

=== Initial release ===
==== Audi Q3 (2011) ====
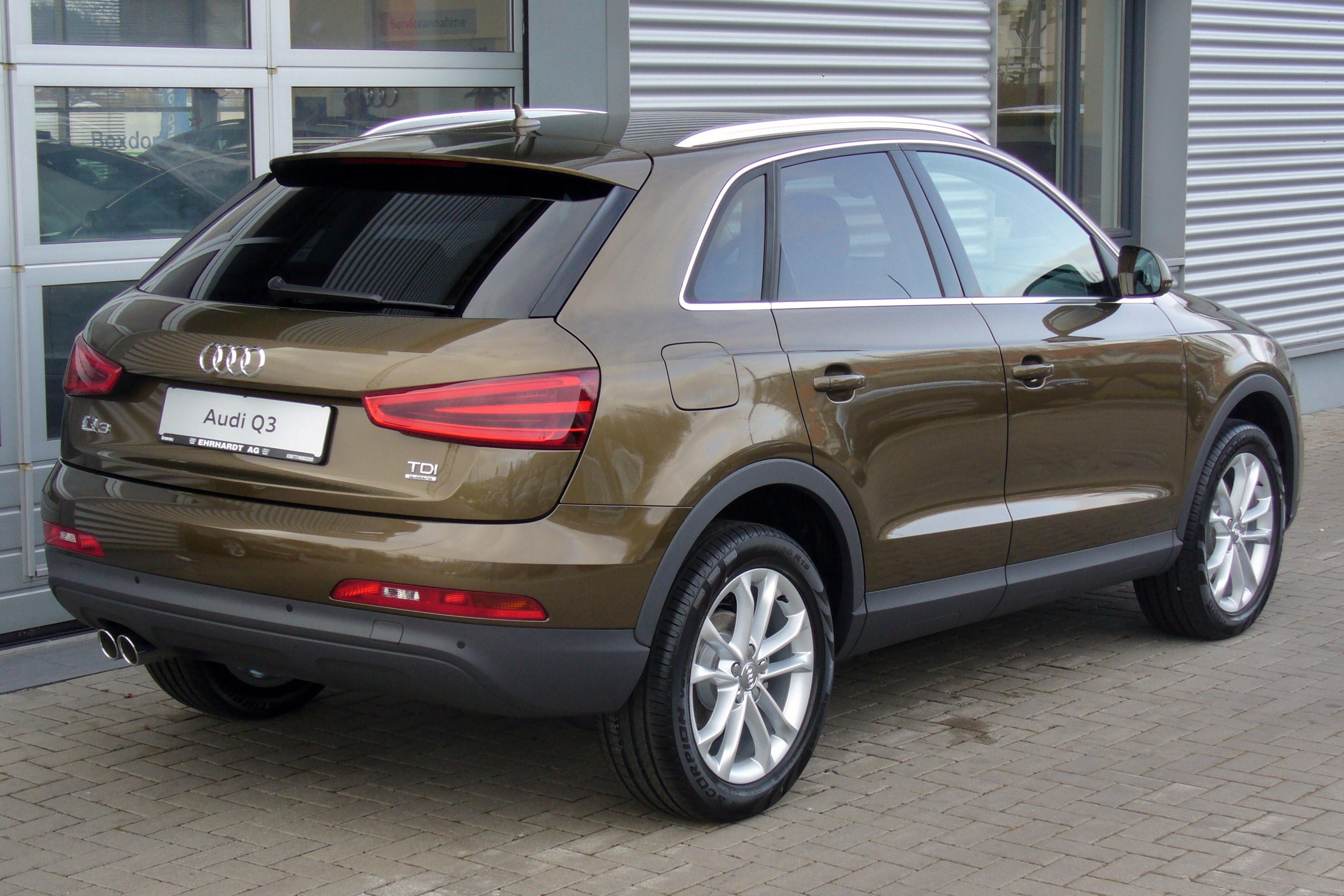
Audi Q3 (pre-facelift)

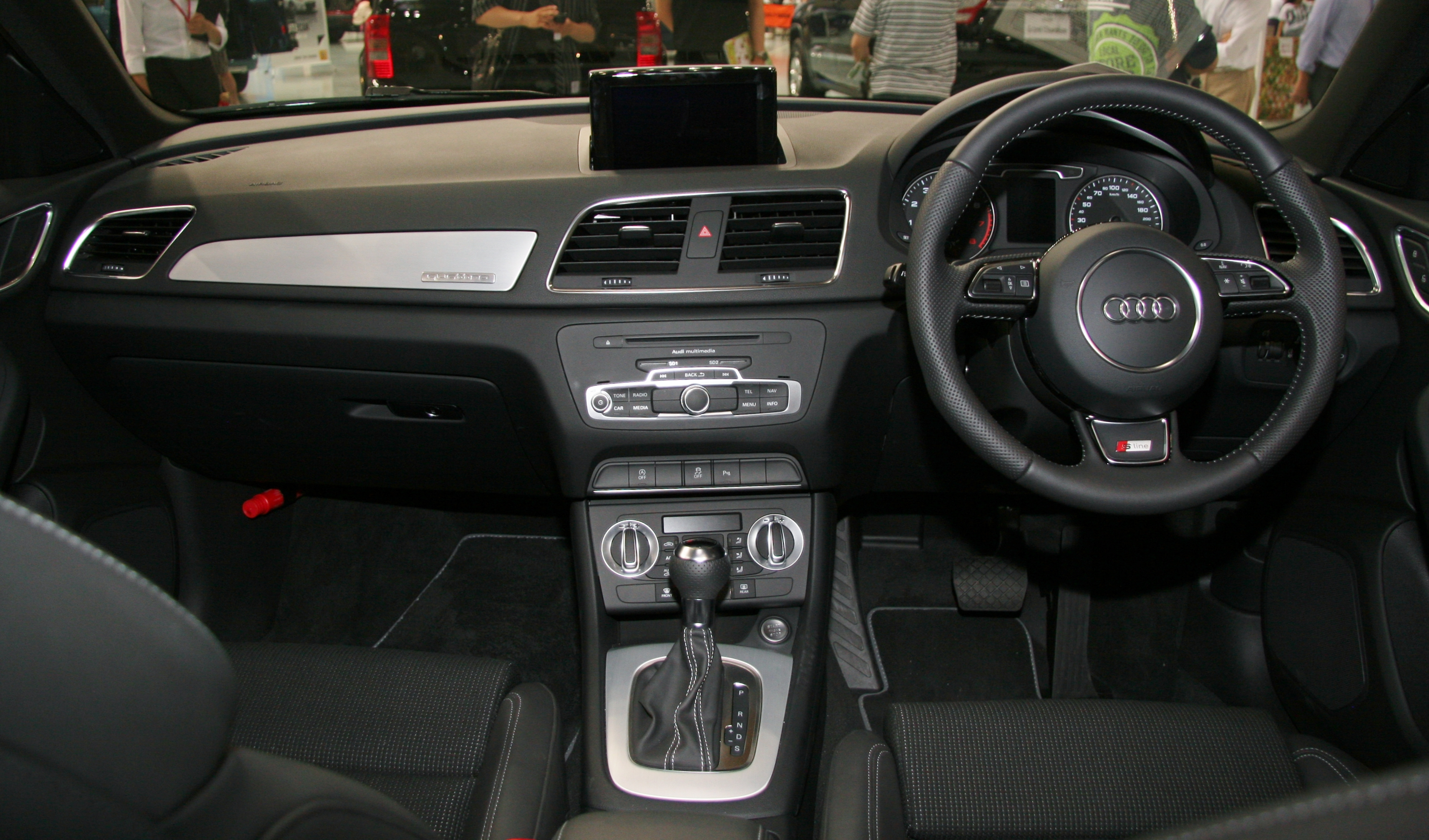
Interior

The car uses the Volkswagen Group A (PQ46) platform of the Volkswagen Passat B6, the same as the Volkswagen Tiguan compact SUV. The Q3 slots above the Audi Q2 subcompact crossover SUV. Compared to the compact luxury crossover SUV Q5 and mid-size luxury crossover SUV Q7, which are positioned more for family practicality and off-road performance, the Q3 is aimed as more of a lifestyle/sports automobile. Design and development began following board approval in the second half of 2007. Julian Hoenig's design was chosen for production and frozen in 2009.

The Q3 shares components, transmissions and engines with amongst other vehicles utilising the PQ35 platform, the Volkswagen Golf, Audi A3 and Škoda Yeti.

The vehicle was unveiled at Auto Shanghai 2011.

The vehicles went on sale in June 2011. Early models include 2.0 TFSI quattro (170/211PS), 2.0 TDI (140PS), 2.0 TDI quattro (177PS).

Indian models went on sale in 2012. Early models include 2.0 TDI quattro (177PS).

China models went on sale at the end of July 2012 as an import vehicle. The Changchun-made Audi Q3 entered market in April 2013, which included 35 TFSI (170PS), 35 TFSI quattro (170PS), 40 TFSI quattro (200PS), with 7-speed S Tronic transmissions.

2.0 TDI quattro with 103 kW (138 hp) was introduced in 2012 for Germany market as part of 2012 Paris Motor Show premiere.

2.0 TDI quattro (140PS) was introduced in 2012 for the UK market.

==== Audi Q3 Vail (2012) ====
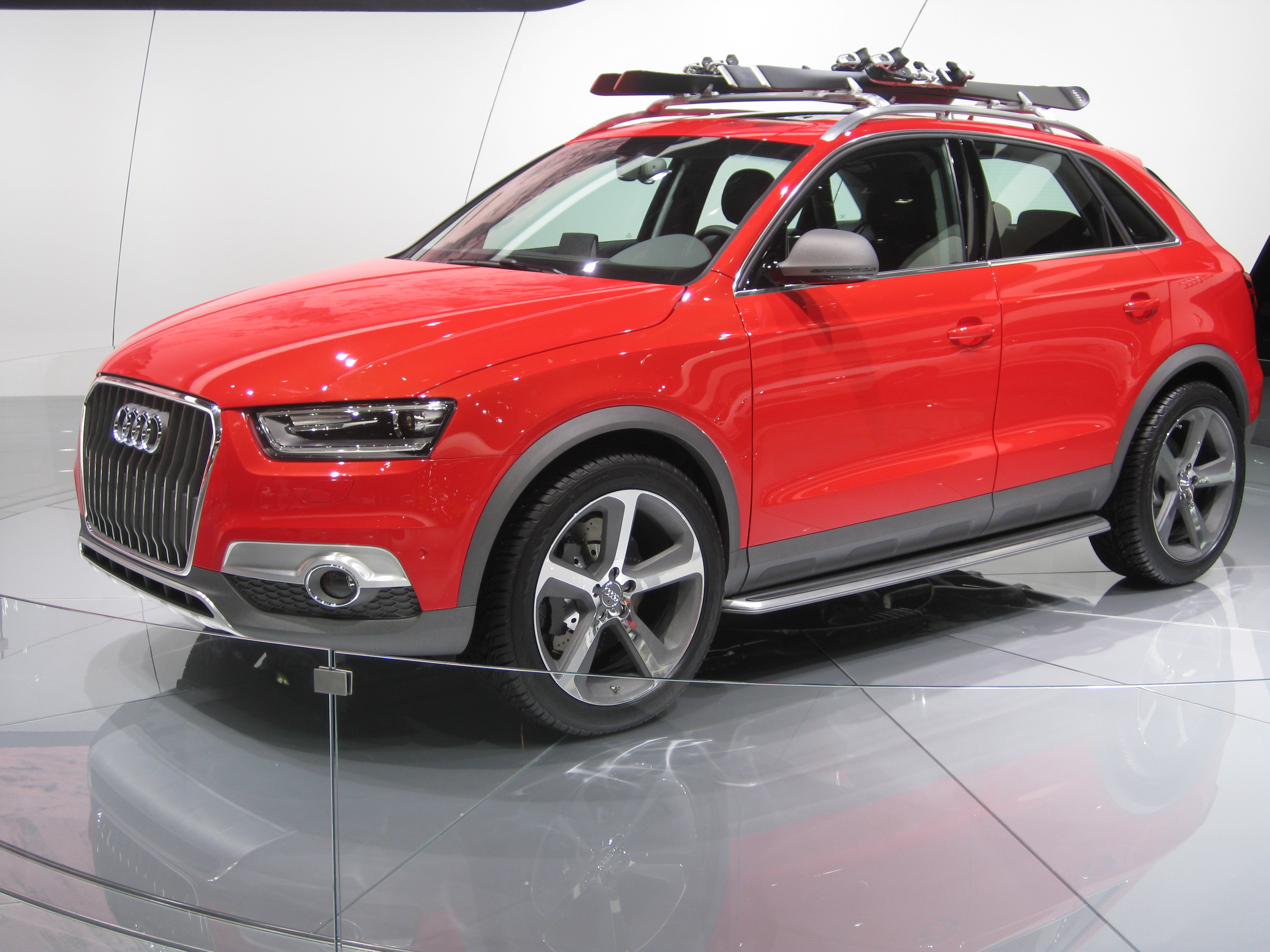
Audi Q3 Vail

It is a concept vehicle based on Audi Q3 with 2.5 TFSI (2,480 cc (2.48 L; 151 cu in) I5 turbo) engine rated at 314 PS (231 kW; 310 hp) and 400 N⋅m (295.02 lbf⋅ft), 7-speed S tronic transmission, Energy Red body colour, add-on body parts are in matt gray quartz-based paint, flared wheel arches and running boards, five-arm 8.5Jx20 wheels in matt quartz, 255/45 off-road tires, 40 mm wider front and rear track widths and 30 mm higher body ride height over production model.

The vehicle was unveiled in 2012 at the North American International Auto Show. The name Vail comes from the well-known town in the Rocky Mountains of Colorado, United States of the same name. Vail, Colorado has a sponsorship coordination with Audi.

==== Audi RS Q3 concept (2012) ====
It is a version of Audi Q3 with blue body colour, 2.5 TFSI (2,480 cc (2.48 L; 151 cu in) I5 turbo) engine rated at 360 PS (265 kW; 355 hp), 25 mm (0.98 in) lowered body, brushed and polished aluminum trim frames, single-frame radiator grille, Dark blue Alcantara on contrasting element on the seat covers, black CFRP door mirror housings, while matt aluminum trim at side windows, Ordos Blue body color, blue clearcoat and black CFRP at diffuser insert, clear glass rear lights and auxiliary lights in the bumper tinted in anthracite, black Fine Nappa leather interior upholstery on roofliner, floor carpet, floor mats, leather-upholstered instrument panel and on large areas of the seat upholstery; steering wheel upholstered in black Velvet leather, door trim panels in blue Alcantara, Chinese characters numerals in tachometer, 7-speed S tronic transmission, quattro permanent all-wheel drive, 8.5 J x 20 wheels with 255/30 tires.

The vehicle was unveiled in Auto China 2012 in Beijing, and later in 2012 Wörthersee Tour.

==== Audi Q3 Jinlong Yufeng (2012) ====
Q3 Jinlong Yufeng (金龍馭風) is a version of Audi Q3 with 2.5 TFSI (2,480 cc (2.48 L; 151 cu in) I5 turbo) engine rated at 310 PS (228 kW; 306 hp), 7-speed S tronic transmission, two kiteboards made of carbon fibre-reinforced polymer, Liuli Yellow body colour, body add-on parts in matt quartz, Vertical aluminum struts in the single-frame radiator grille, xenon plus headlights in anthracite, aluminum panels cover the upper sections of the air intakes, aluminum underbody guard, flared wheel arches, brushed stainless steel running boards, roofliner in titanium gray Alcantara, black interior surfaces, instrument panel upholstered in black Fine Nappa leather and decorated with yellow contrasting seams, fine aluminum accents at instrument cluster, leather-trimmed steering wheel with contrasting yellow seams and two large shift paddles, foot rests and pedal made of stainless steel with rubber caps, seats upholstered in woven leather (narrow strips of leather interwoven with yarn, yellow piping and contrasting seams), side panels of the seat cushions and seatbacks in yellow Velvet leather, Velvet leather in parts of the door trim panels, stainless steel mesh decorative inlays, five-arm 8.5Jx20 wheels in matt quartz, 255/45 off-road tires, 40 mm wider front and rear track widths and 30 mm higher body ride height over production model.

The vehicle was unveiled in Auto China 2012 in Beijing, and later in 2012 Wörthersee Tour.

==== Audi Q3 red track (2012) ====
It is a version of Audi Q3 with 2.5 TFSI (2,480 cc (2.48 L; 151 cu in) I5 turbo) engine rated 340 PS (250 kW; 335 hp) and 450 N⋅m (331.90 lbf⋅ft), 7-speed S tronic transmission, Energy Red body colour, five-arm 8.5Jx20 wheels in matt quartz, 255/45 off-road tires, 40mm wider front and rear track widths and 30mm higher body ride height over production model, headlining in titanium gray Alcantara, black interior, floor mats in black with narrow strips of red Velvet leather.

The vehicle was unveiled in 2012 Wörthersee Tour.

==== Audi RS Q3 (2013-2016) ====
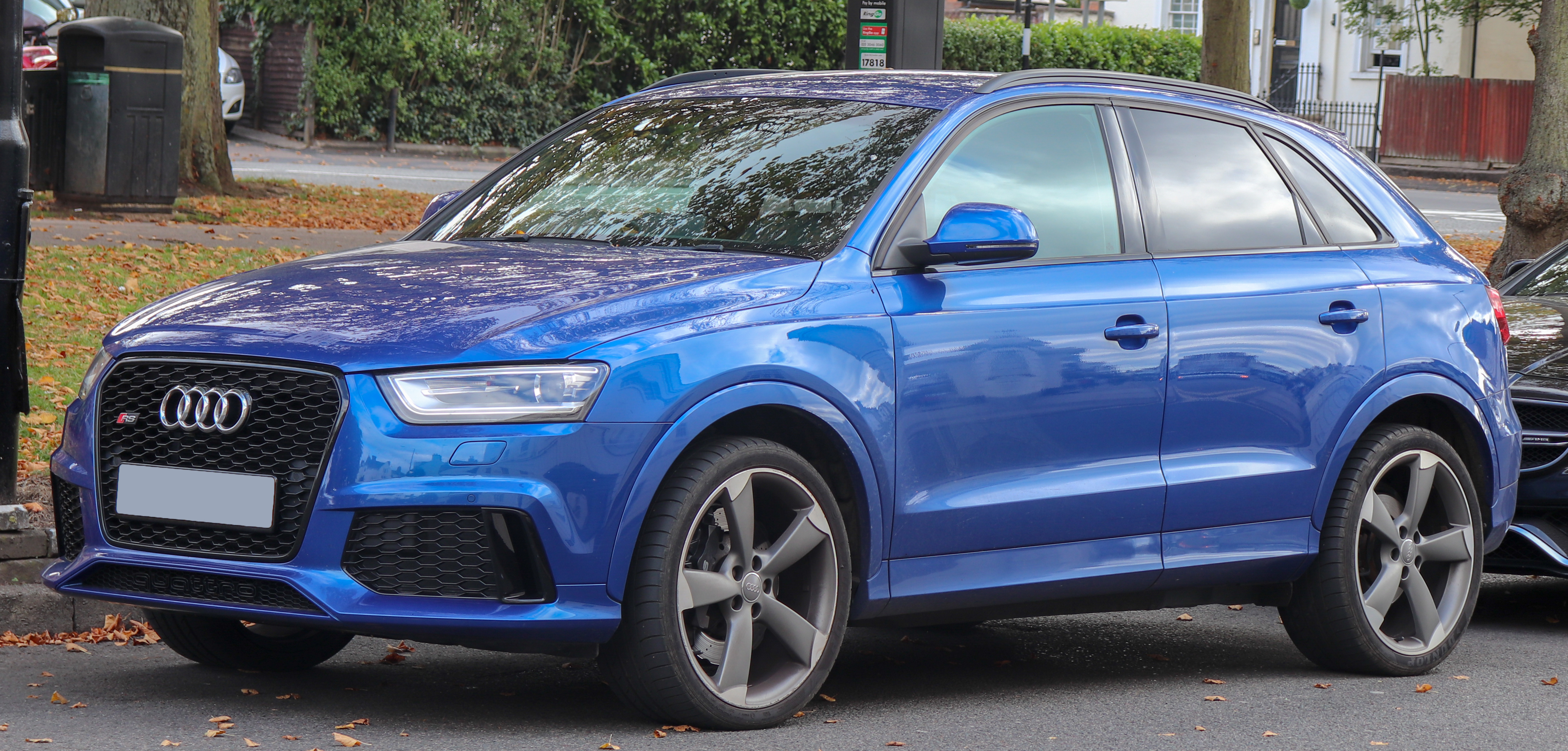
Audi RS Q3 (2013-2014)

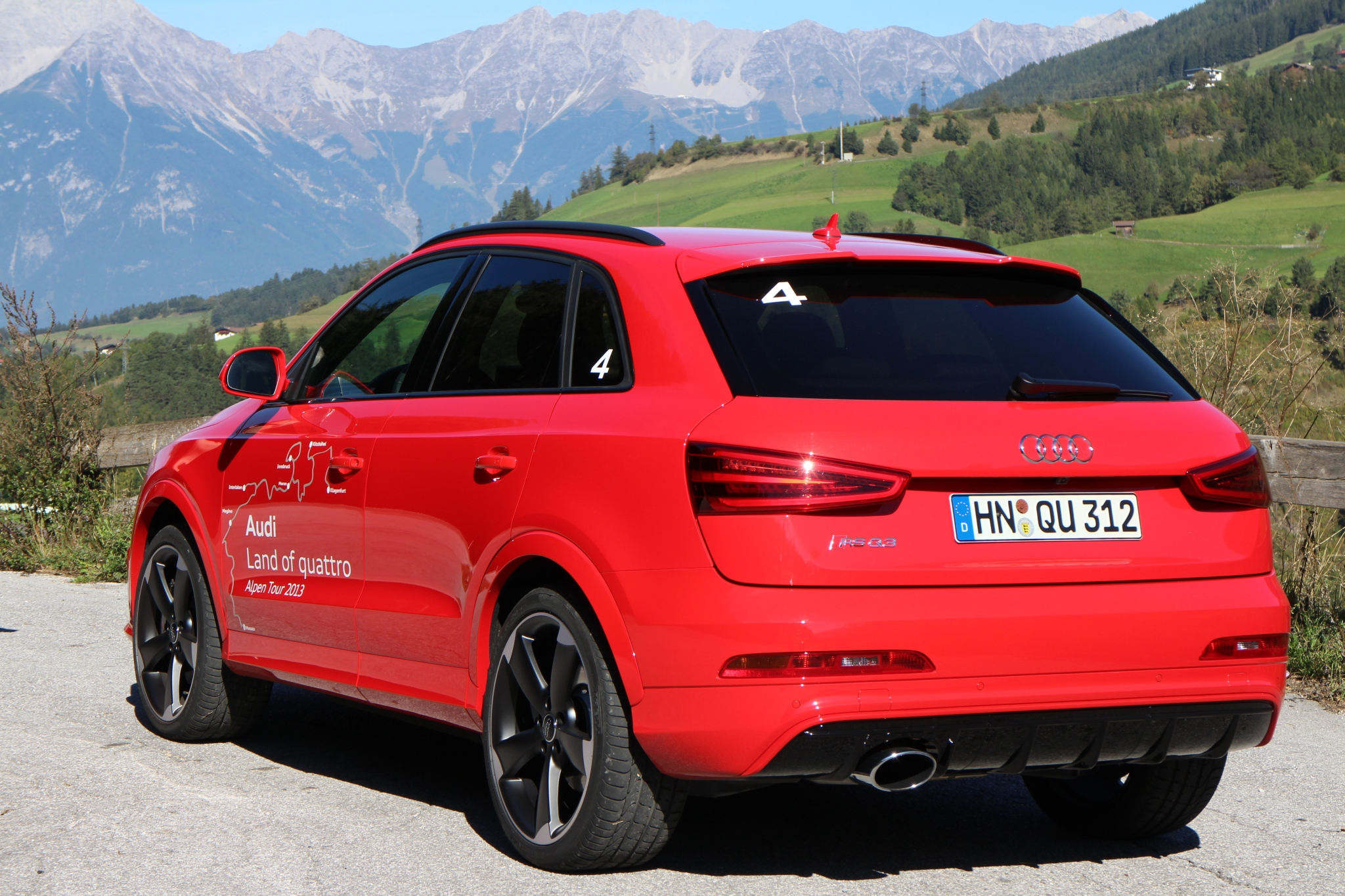
Rear view

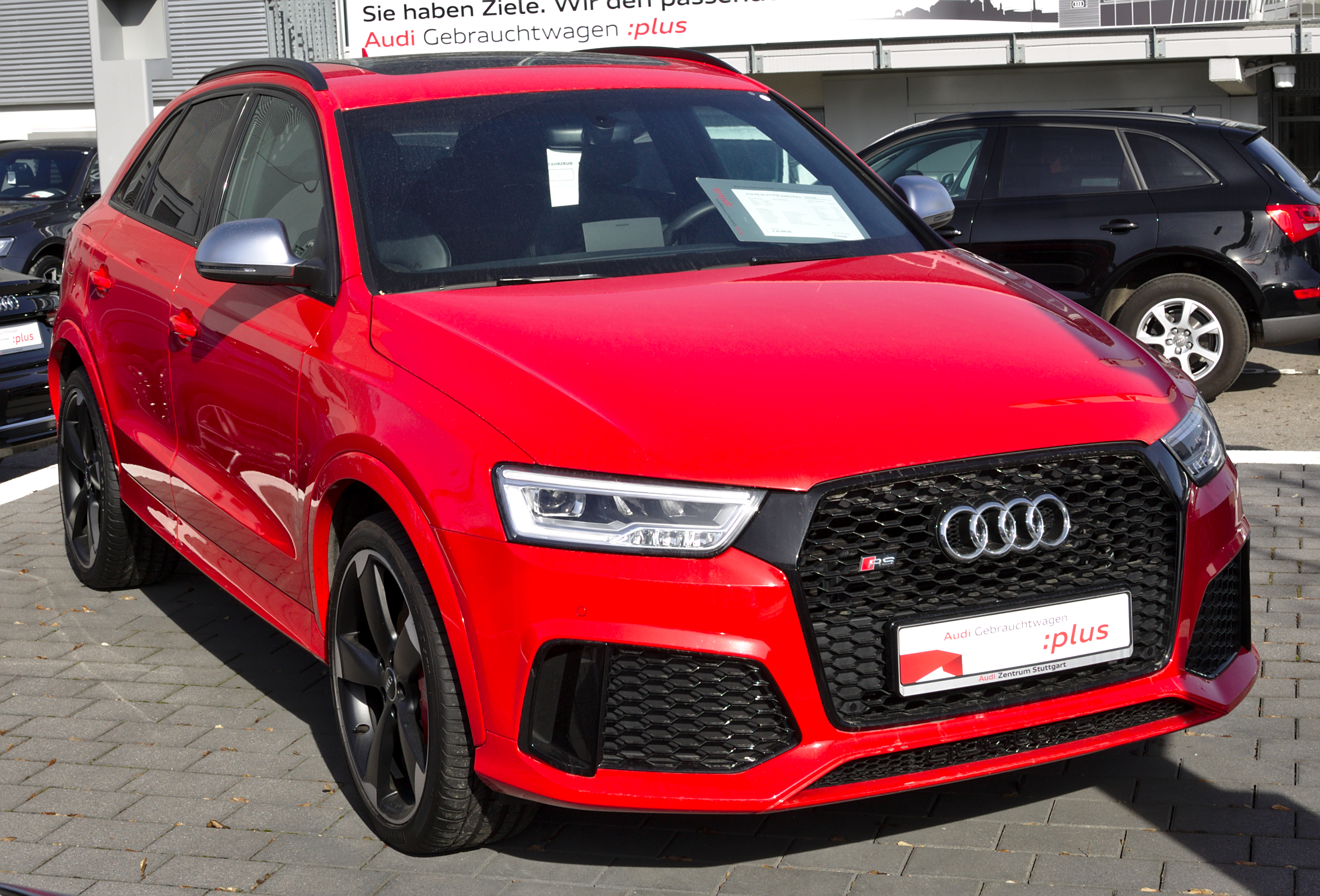
Audi RS Q3 (2015-2016)

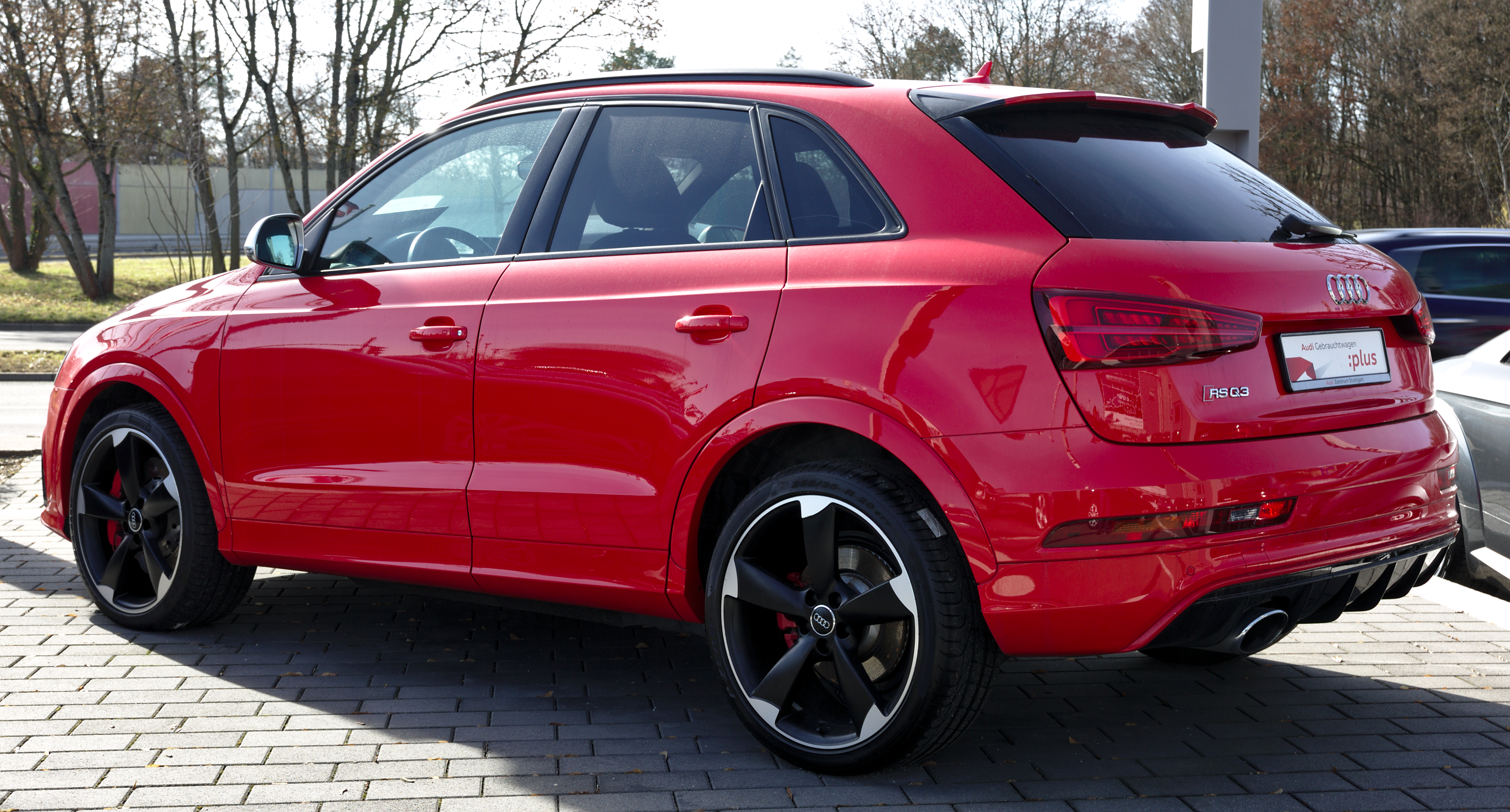
Rear view

It is the first production turbo model in a Q-series vehicle; based on the Audi RS Q3 concept. It features a 2.5 TFSI (2.5 L; 151 cu in) I5 turbo engine rated at 310 PS (228 kW; 306 hp) at 5200-6700 rpm and 420 N⋅m (309.78 lbf⋅ft) at 1500-5200 rpm, 7-speed S-tronic transmission with D and S modes, battery located in the luggage compartment, 4-link independent rear wheel suspensions, electro-mechanical rack and pinion steering, electro-mechanical parking brake and hill hold assist, 365 mm (14.37 in) ventilated and perforated front brake discs with wave-shaped outer contours, black eight-piston calipers with RS logos, electronic stabilization control (ESC) with sport mode, 19-inch alloy wheels in German market (optional 20-inch wheels, with exclusive 5 dual-spoke V design from Audi RS Q3 concept), body accents and roof rails in matt aluminum, special door sill plates and door trim strips, a high-gloss black honeycomb front grille, RS front bumper and quattro emblem in the front air intake, roof spoiler, rear bumper with diffuser insert, elliptical tailpipe, a rear RS Q3 logo, choice of 8 body colors (including the exclusive Sepang Blue pearl effect), instrument cluster with gray gauges and white scales and red pointers, contrasting stitching in rock gray trim at flat bottom three-spoke multifunction steering wheel and gear selector lever, Multi Media Interface and driver information system with RS logo, RS menu with boost pressure, oil temperature and a lap timer; pedals and foot support in aluminum look, inlays in piano finish black (optional aluminum race or carbon), black (optional lunar silver) headlining, sport seats with embossed RS Q3 logos upholstered in black Alcantara/leather (optional Fine Nappa leather in black or lunar silver with contrasting stitching in rock gray or the design package with diamond stitching), reversible loadliner, optional towing bracket, RS-specific driver information system (park assist plus), Audi sound system with ten loudspeakers, xenon plus headlights, LED tail lights. The car accelerates from 0 to 100 km/h (62 mph) in 5.5 seconds and onto a limited top speed of 250 km/h (155.34 mph).

Infotainment options include MMI Navigation plus, Bose surround sound system with 14 loudspeakers with up to 465 watts of output power, Bluetooth car phone online advanced driver-assistance systems.

Optional styling packages (in matt aluminum or black) include flaps in the side air intakes, the trim on the diffuser, and the fins on the roof spoiler.

The vehicle was unveiled at the 2013 Geneva Motor Show, followed by Wörthersee Tour 2013.

Deliveries of the German model began in the late 2013.

Deliveries in the UK started in early 2014.

It will not be available in Canada.

In late September 2015, it was found out that the Volkswagen Group had implanted a defeat device to cheat emission tests. The Audi Q3 was also listed to be fitted with one such device.

==== Engines ====
Petrol engines
| Model | Year | Engine type | Power, torque@rpm |
|---|---|---|---|
| Q3 1.4 TFSI | 2013-2014 | 1,395 cc (1.395 L; 85.1 cu in) I4 turbo (CHPB) | 150 PS (110 kW; 148 hp)@5000–6000, 250 N⋅m (184.39 lbf⋅ft)@1750-3000 |
| Q3 1.4 TFSI COD | 2014-2018 | 1,395 cc (1.395 L; 85.1 cu in) I4 turbo (CZDA/CZEA) | 150 PS (110 kW; 148 hp)@5000–6000, 250 N⋅m (184.39 lbf⋅ft)@1500-3500 |
| Q3 2.0 TFSI (quattro option) | 2011-2014 | 1,984 cc (1.984 L; 121.1 cu in) I4 turbo (CCZC) | 170 PS (125 kW; 168 hp)@4300–6200, 280 N⋅m (206.52 lbf⋅ft)@1700-4200 |
| Q3 2.0 TFSI (quattro option) | 2014-2018 | 1,984 cc (1.984 L; 121.1 cu in) I4 turbo (CULB) | 180 PS (132 kW; 178 hp)@4000–6200, 320 N⋅m (236.02 lbf⋅ft)@1400-3900 |
| Q3 2.0 TFSI (quattro option) (North America) | 2014-2018 | 1,984 cc (1.984 L; 121.1 cu in) I4 turbo (CCTA) | 200 PS (147 kW; 197 hp)@5100–6000, 280 N⋅m (206.52 lbf⋅ft)@1700-5000 |
| Q3 2.0 TFSI quattro | 2011-2014 | 1,984 cc (1.984 L; 121.1 cu in) I4 turbo (CPSA) | 211 PS (155 kW; 208 hp)@5000–6200, 300 N⋅m (221.27 lbf⋅ft)@1800-4900 |
| Q3 2.0 TFSI quattro | 2014-2018 | 1,984 cc (1.984 L; 121.1 cu in) I4 turbo (CULC) | 220 PS (162 kW; 217 hp)@4500–6200, 350 N⋅m (258.15 lbf⋅ft)@1500-4400 |
| RS Q3 | 2013-2014 | 2,480 cc (2.48 L; 151 cu in) I5 turbo (CTSA) | 310 PS (228 kW; 306 hp)@5200–6700, 420 N⋅m (309.78 lbf⋅ft)@1500-5200 |
| RS Q3 | 2015-2016 | 2,480 cc (2.48 L; 151 cu in) I5 turbo (CZGA) | 340 PS (250 kW; 335 hp)@5300–6700, 450 N⋅m (331.90 lbf⋅ft)@1600-5300 |
| RS Q3 performance | 2016 | 2,480 cc (2.48 L; 151 cu in) I5 turbo (CZGB) | 367 PS (270 kW; 362 hp)@5550–6800, 465 N⋅m (342.97 lbf⋅ft)@1625-5500 |
Diesel engines
| Model | Year | Engine type | Power, torque@rpm |
| Q3 2.0 TDI | 2015-2018 | 1,968 cc (1.968 L; 120.1 cu in) I4 turbo common rail (?) | 120 PS (88 kW; 118 hp)@3250-4500, 290 N⋅m (213.89 lbf⋅ft)@1500-2750 |
| Q3 2.0 TDI (quattro option) | 2011-2014 | 1,968 cc (1.968 L; 120.1 cu in) I4 turbo common rail (CFFB) | 140 PS (103 kW; 138 hp)@4200-4200, 320 N⋅m (236.02 lbf⋅ft)@1750-2500 |
| Q3 2.0 TDI (quattro option) | 2014-2018 | 1,968 cc (1.968 L; 120.1 cu in) I4 turbo common rail (CFFB) | 150 PS (110 kW; 148 hp)@3500-4000, 340 N⋅m (250.77 lbf⋅ft)@1750-2800 |
| Q3 2.0 TDI (quattro option) | 2011-2014 | 1,968 cc (1.968 L; 120.1 cu in) I4 turbo common rail (CLLB) | 177 PS (130 kW; 175 hp)@4200-4200, 380 N⋅m (280.27 lbf⋅ft)@1750-2500 |
| Q3 2.0 TDI (quattro option) | 2014-2018 | 1,968 cc (1.968 L; 120.1 cu in) I4 turbo common rail (CUWA) | 184 PS (135 kW; 181 hp)@3500-4000, 380 N⋅m (280.27 lbf⋅ft)@1800-3250 |

==== Transmissions ====
Petrol engines
| Model | Year | Types |
|---|---|---|
| Q3 1.4 TFSI | 2014-2018 | 6-speed manual, 6-speed S tronic (DQ250) |
| Q3 2.0 TFSI quattro (170PS) | 2011-2018 | 6-speed manual, 7-speed S tronic (DQ500) |
| Q3 2.0 TFSI quattro (180PS) | 2011-2018 | 6-speed manual, 7-speed S tronic (DQ500) |
| Q3 2.0 TFSI quattro (200PS) North America | 2014-2018 | 6-speed automatic (Aisin TF-60SN (09M)) |
| Q3 2.0 TFSI quattro (211PS) | 2011-2018 | 7-speed S tronic (DQ500) |
| Q3 2.0 TFSI quattro (220PS) | 2011-2018 | 7-speed S tronic (DQ500) |
| RS Q3 | 2012-2018 | 7-speed S tronic (DQ500) |
Diesel engines
| Model | Year | Types |
| Q3 2.0 TDI (120PS) | 2011-2018 | 6-speed manual |
| Q3 2.0 TDI (140PS) | 2011-2018 | 6-speed manual, 7-speed S tronic (DQ500) |
| Q3 2.0 TDI quattro (150PS) | 2014-2018 | 6-speed manual, 7-speed S tronic (DQ500) |
| Q3 2.0 TDI quattro (177PS) | 2011-2018 | 6-speed manual, 7-speed S tronic (DQ500) |
| Q3 2.0 TDI quattro (184PS) | 2014-2018 | 6-speed manual, 7-speed S tronic (DQ500) |

==== Safety ====
ANCAP test results* Audi Q3 (2012)
| Test | Score |
|---|---|
| Overall | 5 /5 stars |
| Frontal offset | 15.15/16 |
| Side impact | 16/16 |
| Pole | 2/2 |
| Seat belt reminders | 2/3 |
| Whiplash protection | Good |
| Pedestrian protection | Marginal |
| Electronic stability control | Standard |

Euro NCAP tested the Audi Q3, 5-door Compact SUV with front airbags, side airbags, seatbelt pretensioners and load limiters as standard and scored it accordingly:

Euro NCAP test results* Audi Q3 LHD, 5-door SUV (2011)
| Test | Points | % |
|---|---|---|
| Overall: | 5 /5 stars | |
| Adult occupant: | 34 | 94% |
| Child occupant: | 42 | 85% |
| Pedestrian: | 19 | 52% |
| Safety assist: | 6 | 86% |

==== Production ====
On 2011-06-07, Audi announced the production of Audi Q3 began at SEAT factory in Martorell, located in Spain's Catalonia region, with annual production of approximately 100,000 Q3 units. In 1998, the production facility was chosen as the "Best Factory of the VW Group in the first quarter". Production at Martorell began on 2011-07-13 with Spanish Prince Felipe's inauguration at Martorell plant.

The Audi Q3 is built in a FAW-Volkswagen plant in Changchun, China in a joint venture with its partner FAW; production began in 2013. The Changchun-made Audi Q3 first entered the market in April 2013.

==== Marketing ====
As part of Audi A3 launch in China, Audi Q3 Trans China Tour 2011 began in 2011-10-15, featuring roughly 160 participants driving Audi Q3 2.0 TFSI quattro S tronic (211PS) in a 16-stage 5,700 kilometres (3,542 miles) route starting from Beijing to Shanghai, Shenzhen, Guilin, and ending in Hong Kong. The tour ended with 20 cars arriving at the final destination in Shenzhen near Hong Kong.

As part of Audi A3 launch in Taiwan, more than 11 famous independent bands were invited to present Q3 Urban Music Festival.

As part of RS Q3 launch, Audi Land of quattro Alpen Tour 2013 featured the RS Q3 travelling across twelve driving stages in 6 countries (Klagenfurt – the capital of Carinthia, Austria, Monaco).

=== 2014 update ===
==== Audi Q3 (2014–2016) ====
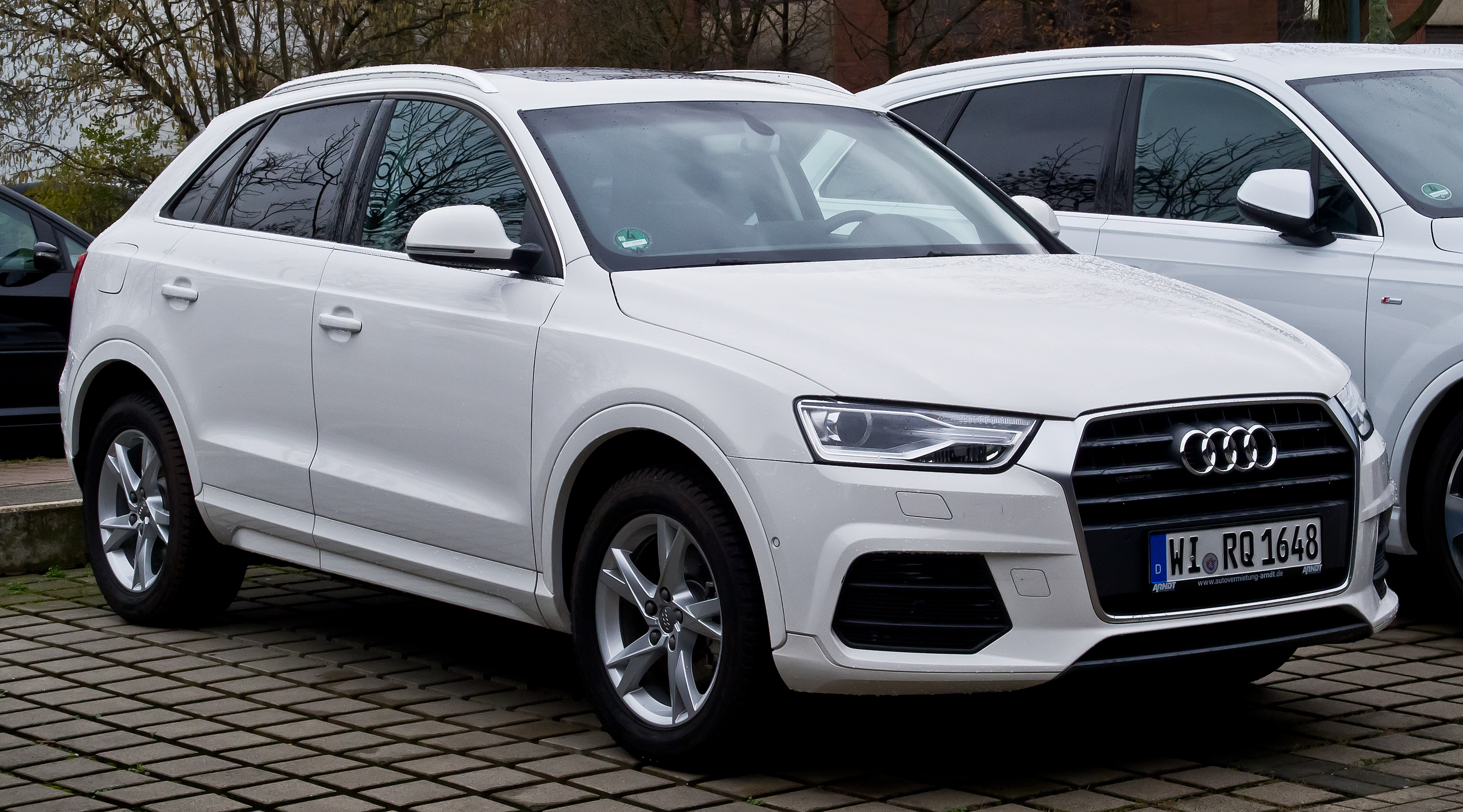

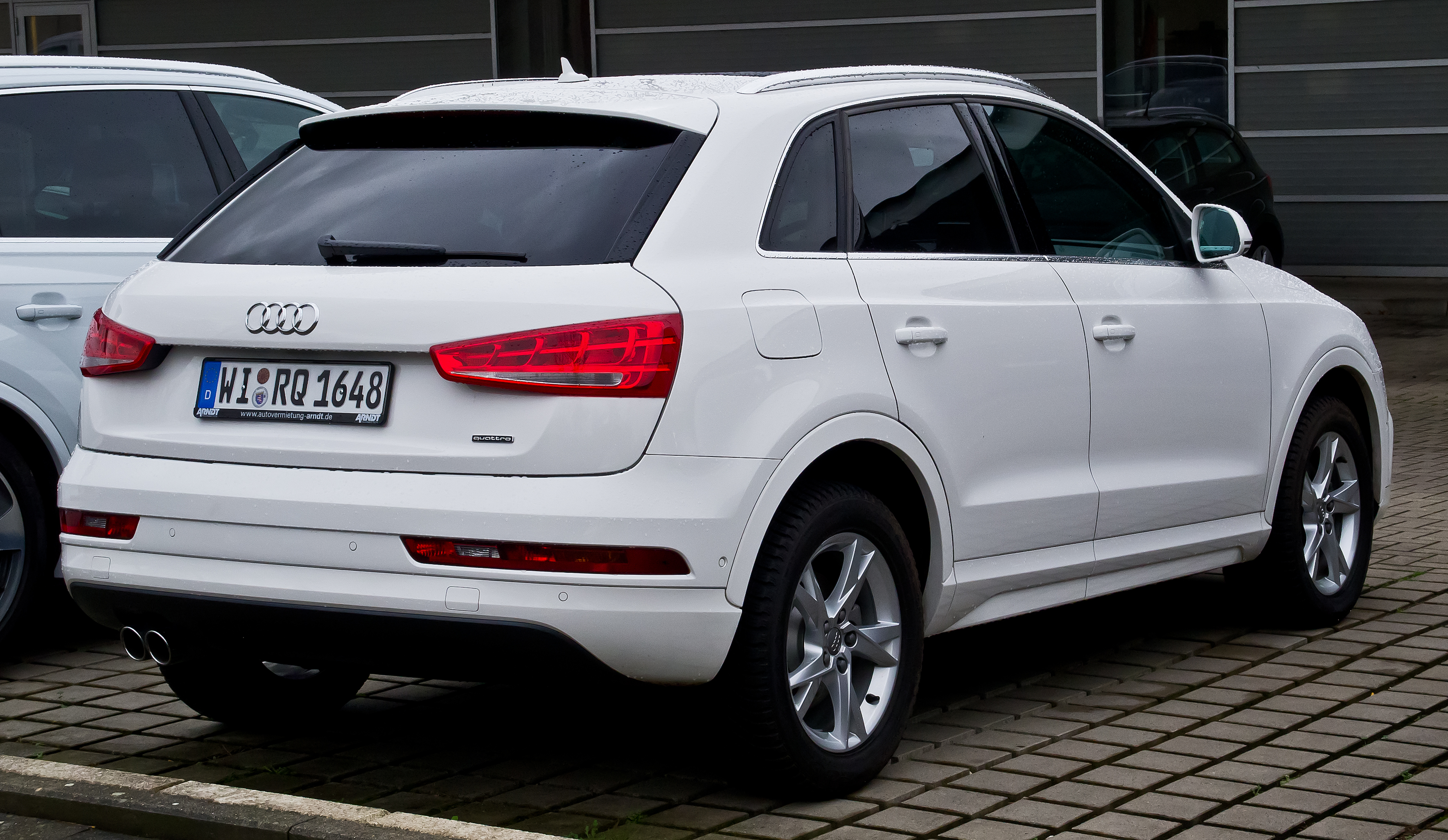
2014 update

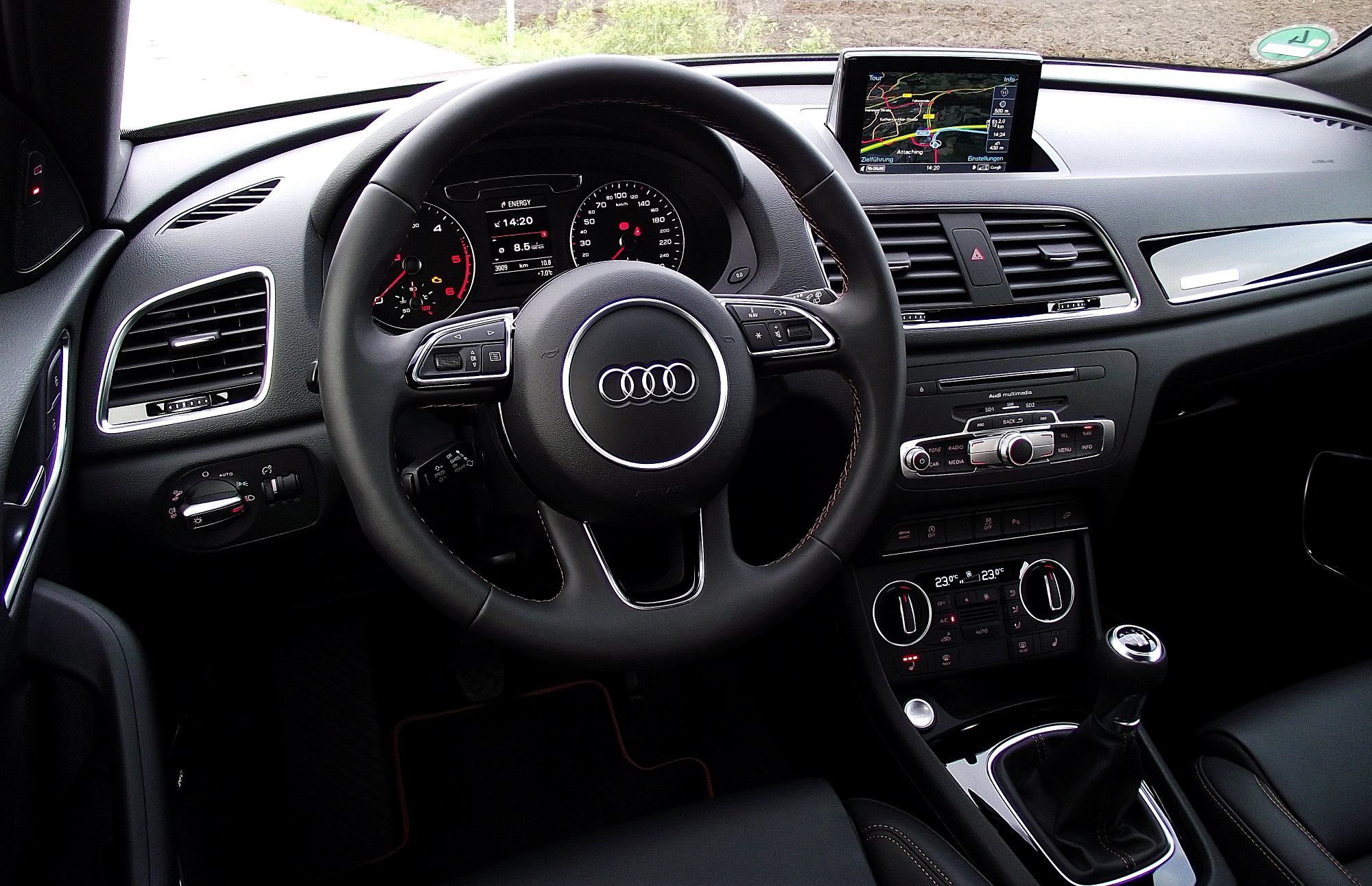
Interior (2014 update)

In 2014 the Audi Q3 received a facelift for the 2015 model year. The grille on the 2015 version has a wider chrome surround to it, which touches the headlights at each side. The lower air vents have been enlarged slightly, and the lights themselves have re-profiled LEDs to give the car a more recognisable look in the dark. The wheel arch surrounds and door sills are body coloured on the base model (they used to be black plastic), as is the rear bumper design, which sits below subtly reshaped lower tail light clusters. Also there are new alloy wheel designs to finish off the refresh.

The changes to the inside are even more difficult to spot than those on the outside. Styling-wise, the only thing of note is a new steering wheel design. There is the option to specify blind spot and lane departure warning systems if you wish. The boot remains the same volume at 420 litres, expanding to 1,325 litres when the rear seats are folded flat.

Across the range, each engine has seen an improvement in performance, efficiency or both. The 1.4-litre turbocharged petrol became equipped with cylinder-on-demand technology, which saves fuel by shutting down a couple of cylinders when less power is needed.

The 2.0 TFSI petrol units uprated to produce 180 PS (132 kW; 178 hp) and 220 PS (162 kW; 217 hp). The two diesel motors receive boosts of eight and four horsepower, to 150 PS (110 kW; 148 hp) and 184 PS (135 kW; 181 hp) respectively. The more performance-oriented RS Q3 gains a sizeable 30 PS (22 kW; 30 hp) over the old model, and torque uprated to 332 lb⋅ft (450 N⋅m), marginally up from the old version.

The vehicle was unveiled in 2014 North American International Auto Show.

US models went on sale in late 2014 as 2015 model year vehicles. Early models included 2.0 TFSI (200 PS), 2.0 TFSI quattro (200 PS).

=== 2015 update ===
==== Audi Q3, RS Q3 (2015–2018) ====
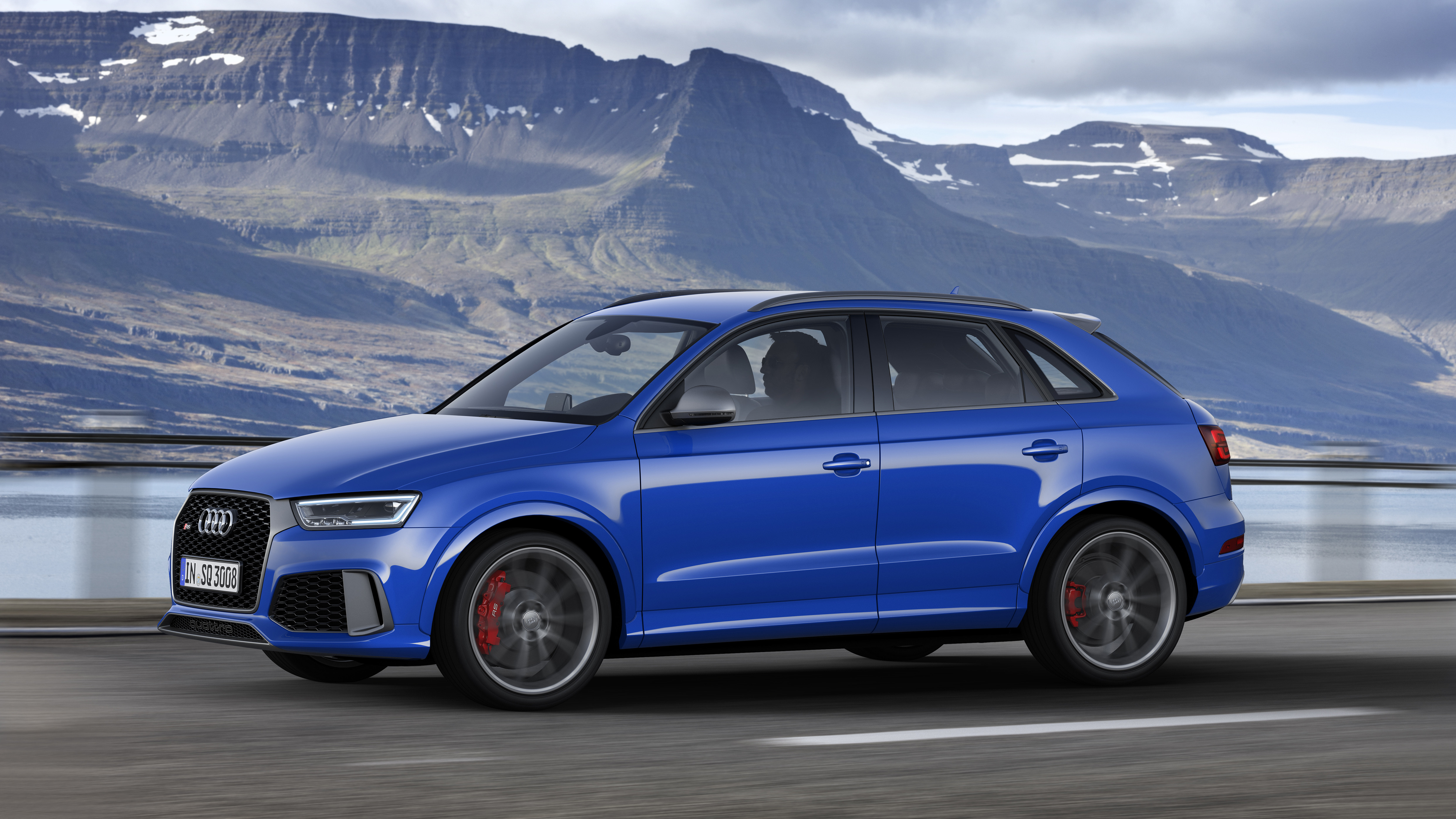
RS Q3 2015

Changes include redesign of front lights, grille, and exterior fascia; Alu-optic interior MMI controls and interior upgrades, front and rear parking sensors with rearview camera join wide array of standard equipment, full LED headlights and dynamic rear turn signals on Prestige models.

The vehicles went on sale in February 2015, with delivery of RS Q3 began in the first quarter of 2015. Early models included Q3 2.0 TDI clean diesel (110 kW), Q3 2.0 TDI clean diesel ultra (110 kW), Q3 TDI clean diesel quattro (110/135 kW), Q3 1.4 TFSI COD (110 kW), Q3 1.4 TFSI COD ultra (110 kW), Q3 2.0 TFSI quattro (132/162 kW), RS Q3 2.5 TFSI (250 kW).

Early German models included Q3 1.4 TFSI COD (110 kW), Q3 1.4 TFSI COD ultra (110 kW), Q3 2.0 TFSI (132 kW), Q3 2.0 TFSI quattro (132/162 kW), Q3 2.0 TDI (88/110/135 kW), Q3 2.0 TDI ultra (110 kW), Q3 2.0 TDI quattro (110/135 kW). Q3 2.0 TFSI (132 kW), Q3 2.0 TDI (135 kW) were dropped as of 2016.

US and Canada models went on sale as 2016 model year vehicles. Early models included Q3 2.0 TFSI (147 kW), Q3 2.0 TFSI quattro (147 kW).

==== Audi connected mobility concept (2016) ====
Developed at Audi Research & Development in Beijing, it is a version of Q3 with an electrically powered multifunctional longboard integrated into the car's rear bumper.

The vehicle was unveiled in Auto China 2016.

==== RS Q3 performance (2016) ====
It is a version of RS Q3 with increased engine power to 367 PS (270 kW; 362 hp) and 465 N⋅m (342.97 lbf⋅ft), seven-speed S tronic transmission, matt titanium-look finish parts (frame of the air inlet duct and the quattro logo, singleframe, lateral flaps in the air inlets, trim strips at the side windows, exterior mirror housings, roof rails, upper edge of the diffuser, fins of the roof edge spoiler), Ascari blue metallic body colour, 20-inch wheels in a five twin-spoke V design in matt titanium, red brake calipers bearing the RS logo (optional black calipers), dial instruments in gray faces, white dials and red needles; seats in the color combination black and blue with optional RS performance design package, blue contrast stitching at RS sport leather steering wheel, selector lever gaiter, centre armrest and the floor mats; inlays in carbon twill blue with blue thread is woven into the carbon material.

The vehicle was unveiled in 2016 the Geneva Motor Show. Delivery began in the second quarter of 2016.

==== Engines ====
Petrol engines
| Model | Year | Engine type | Power, torque@rpm |
|---|---|---|---|
| Q3 1.4 TFSI COD | 2015-2018 | 1,395 cc (1 L; 85 cu in) I4 turbo (CZDA/CZEA) | 150 PS (110 kW; 148 hp)@5000–6000, 250 N⋅m (184.39 lbf⋅ft)@1500-3500 |
| Q3 1.4 TFSI COD ultra | 2015-2018 | 1,395 cc (1 L; 85 cu in) I4 turbo (CZDA/CZEA) | 150 PS (110 kW; 148 hp)@5000–6000, 250 N⋅m (184.39 lbf⋅ft)@1500-3500 |
| Q3 2.0 TFSI (180PS) | 2015-2018 | 1,984 cc (2 L; 121 cu in) I4 turbo (CULB) | 180 PS (132 kW; 178 hp)@4000–6200, 320 N⋅m (236.02 lbf⋅ft)@1400-3900 |
| Q3 2.0 TFSI quattro (180PS) | 2015-2018 | 1,984 cc (2 L; 121 cu in) I4 turbo (CULB) | 180 PS (132 kW; 178 hp)@4000–6200, 320 N⋅m (236.02 lbf⋅ft)@1400-3900 |
| Q3 2.0 TFSI (200PS) | 2015-2018 | 1,984 cc (2 L; 121 cu in) I4 turbo (CCTA) | 200 PS (147 kW; 197 hp)@5100–6000, 280 N⋅m (206.52 lbf⋅ft)@1750-2800 |
| Q3 2.0 TFSI quattro (200PS) | 2015-2018 | 1,984 cc (2 L; 121 cu in) I4 turbo (CCTA) | 200 PS (147 kW; 197 hp)@5100–6000, 280 N⋅m (206.52 lbf⋅ft)@1750-2800 |
| Q3 2.0 TFSI quattro | 2015-2018 | 1,984 cc (2 L; 121 cu in) I4 turbo (CULC) | 220 PS (162 kW; 217 hp)@4500–6200, 350 N⋅m (258.15 lbf⋅ft)@1500-4400 |
| RS Q3 2.5 TFSI quattro | 2015-2016 | 2,480 cc (2 L; 151 cu in) I5 turbo (CZGA) | 340 PS (250 kW; 335 hp)@5300–6700, 450 N⋅m (331.90 lbf⋅ft)@1600-5300 |
| RS Q3 performance | 2016 | 2,480 cc (2 L; 151 cu in) I5 turbo (?) | 367 PS (270 kW; 362 hp)@5550–6800, 465 N⋅m (342.97 lbf⋅ft)@1625-5500 |

Diesel engines
| Model | Year | Engine type | Power, torque@rpm |
|---|---|---|---|
| Q3 2.0 TDI (120PS) | 2015-2018 | 1,968 cc (2 L; 120 cu in) I4 turbo common rail (?) | 120 PS (88 kW; 118 hp)@3250-4500, 290 N⋅m (213.89 lbf⋅ft)@1500-2750 |
| Q3 2.0 TDI (150PS) | 2015-2018 | 1,968 cc (2 L; 120 cu in) I4 turbo common rail (CUVB/CUVC?) | 150 PS (110 kW; 148 hp)@3500-4000, 340 N⋅m (250.77 lbf⋅ft)@1750-2800 |
| Q3 2.0 TDI clean diesel ultra (150PS) | 2015-2018 | 1,968 cc (2 L; 120 cu in) I4 turbo common rail (CUVB/CUVC?) | 150 PS (110 kW; 148 hp)@3500-4000, 340 N⋅m (250.77 lbf⋅ft)@1750-2800 |
| Q3 2.0 TDI ultra (150PS) | 2015-2018 | 1,968 cc (2 L; 120 cu in) I4 turbo common rail (CUVB/CUVC?) | 150 PS (110 kW; 148 hp)@3500-4000, 340 N⋅m (250.77 lbf⋅ft)@1750-2800 |
| Q3 2.0 TDI clean diesel quattro (150PS) | 2015-2018 | 1,968 cc (2 L; 120 cu in) I4 turbo common rail (CUVC) | 150 PS (110 kW; 148 hp)@3500-4000, 340 N⋅m (250.77 lbf⋅ft)@1750-2800 |
| Q3 2.0 TDI quattro (150PS) | 2015-2018 | 1,968 cc (2 L; 120 cu in) I4 turbo common rail (CUVC) | 150 PS (110 kW; 148 hp)@3500-4000, 340 N⋅m (250.77 lbf⋅ft)@1750-2800 |
| Q3 2.0 TDI clean diesel quattro | 2015-2018 | 1,968 cc (2 L; 120 cu in) I4 turbo common rail (CUWA) | 184 PS (135 kW; 181 hp)@3500-4000, 380 N⋅m (280.27 lbf⋅ft)@1800-3250 |
| Q3 2.0 TDI quattro | 2015-2018 | 1,968 cc (2 L; 120 cu in) I4 turbo common rail (CUWA) | 184 PS (135 kW; 181 hp)@3500-4000, 380 N⋅m (280.27 lbf⋅ft)@1800-3250 |

== Second generation (Typ F3; 2018) ==
Second generation
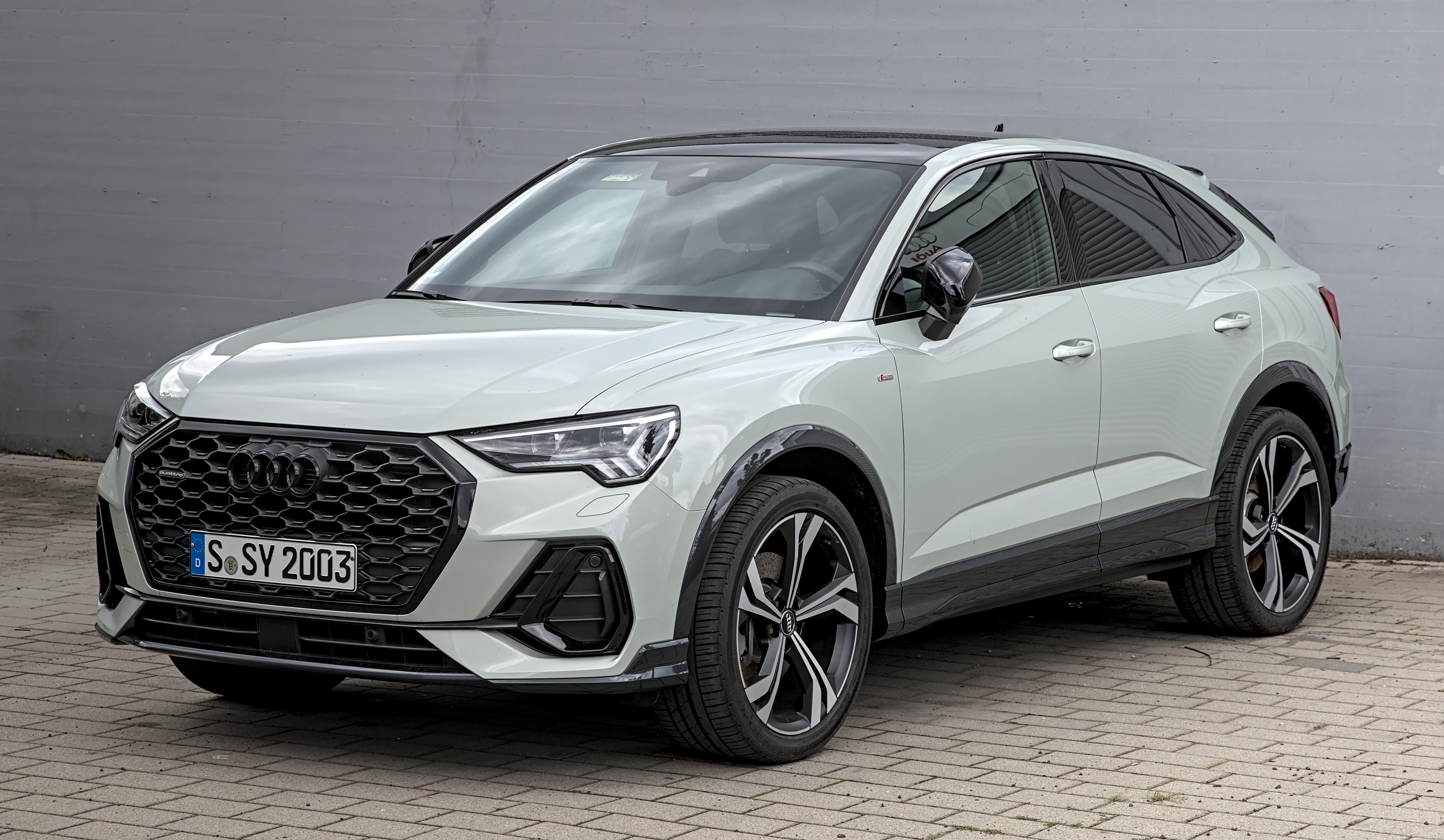
- Audi Q3 Sportback

Overview
- Model code: F3
- Production: August 2018– June 2025
- Model years: 2019–2025
- Assembly: Hungary: Győr (Audi Hungaria); China: Tianjin (FAW-VW); Brazil: Curitiba (Volkswagen Brazil)
- Designer: Matt Baggley

Body and chassis
- Body style: 5-door SUV; 5-door coupé SUV (Sportback)
- Platform: Volkswagen Group MQB A2
- Related: Volkswagen Tiguan Mk2; Volkswagen Tayron; SEAT Tarraco; Škoda Kodiaq

Powertrain
- Engine: Petrol: 1.4 L Volkswagen EA211 (BWK/CAVA) TFSI I4; 1.4 L Volkswagen EA211 (CZDA) TFSI I4; 1.5 L Volkswagen EA211 EVO (DADA) TFSI I4; 2.0 L Volkswagen-Audi EA888 TFSI I4; 2.5 L Volkswagen-Audi DNWA TFSI I5 (RS Q3); Diesel: 2.0 L Volkswagen CRBC TDI I4
- Transmission: 6-speed manual; 6-speed dual-clutch S-tronic; 7-speed dual-clutch S-tronic; 8-speed Tiptronic automatic

Dimensions
- Wheelbase: 2,680 mm (105.5 in)
- Length: 4,485 mm (176.6 in)
- Width: 1,856 mm (73.1 in)
- Height: 1,585 mm (62.4 in); 1,557 mm (61.3 in) (Sportback)

The second-generation Audi Q3, built on the MQB A2 platform was officially unveiled on July 25, 2018. On the Nürburgring race track, a sports version was tested, which would be called SQ3, with an even more powerful version of RS Q3 planned.

A Sportback version was revealed in July 2019. The Q3 Sportback is marginally lower, narrower and longer, with different bumpers, side skirts and body cladding. Aimed at the BMW X2, the lower roofline and raked rear hatch result in less headroom, and 0.14 less cubic meters (5 cubic feet) when the rear seats are folded.

In Europe, a plug-in-hybrid EA211 1.4L turbo four came with the 2021 model year in January 2021 in Germany.

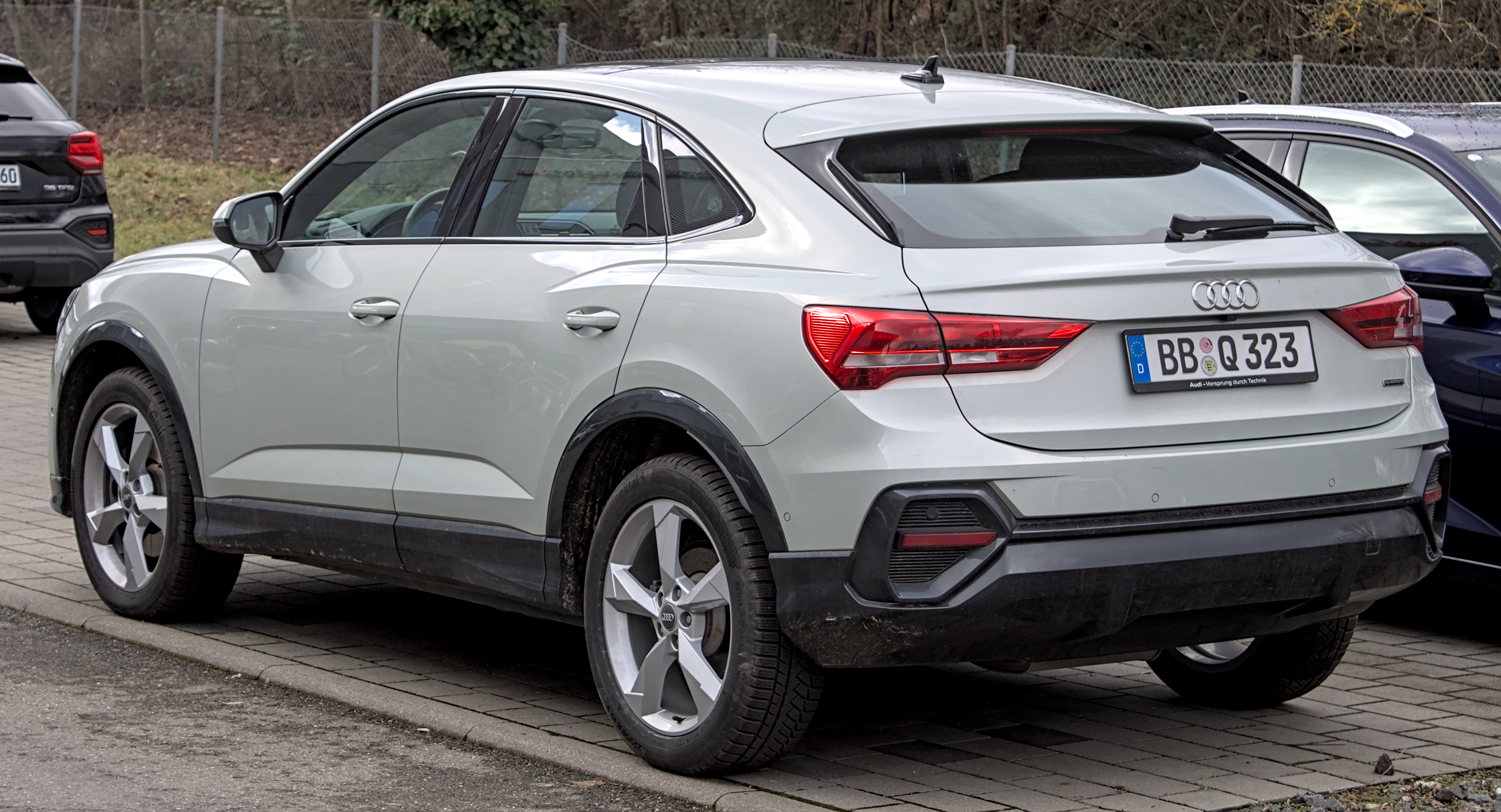
Sportback

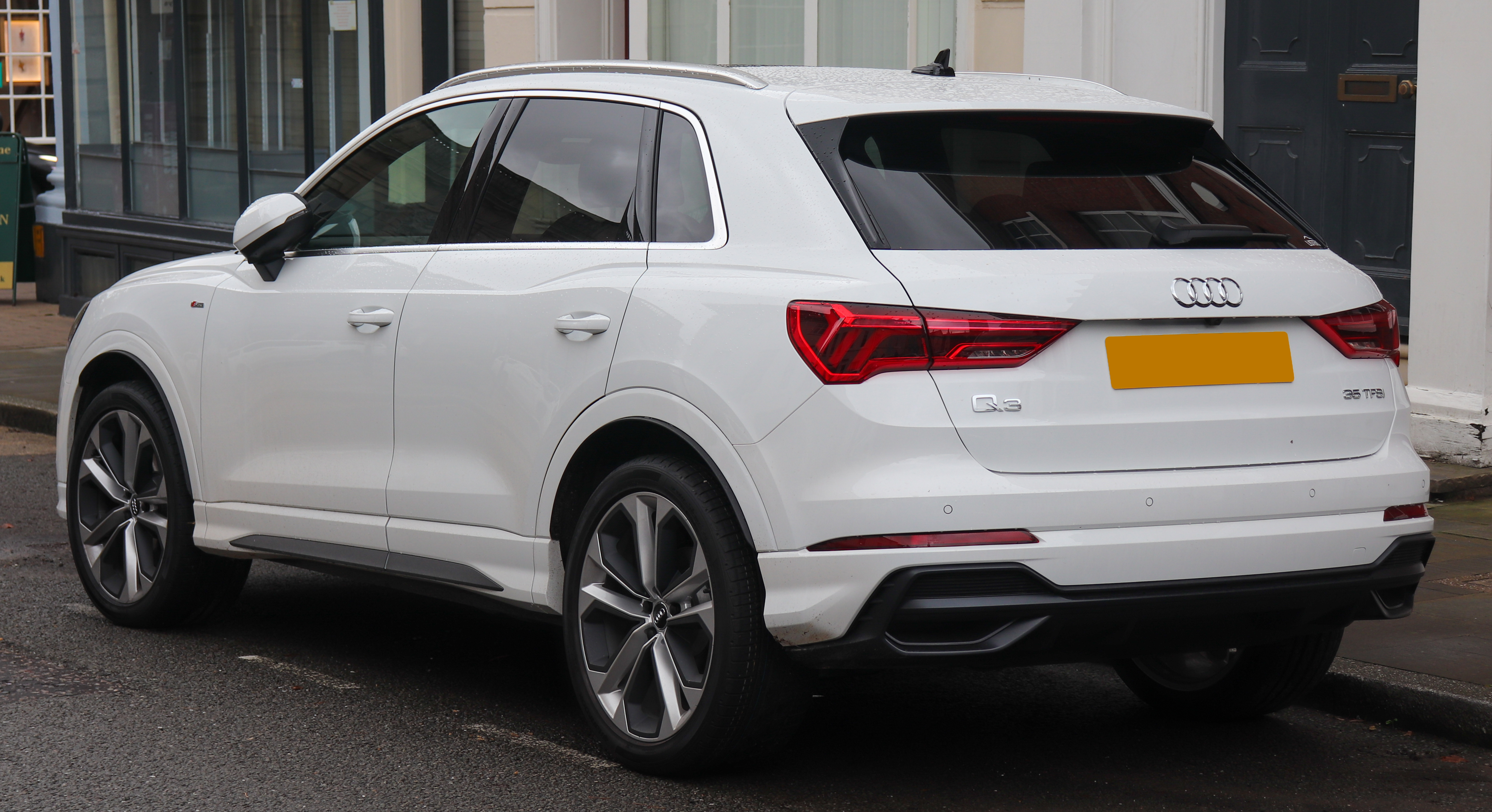
SUV

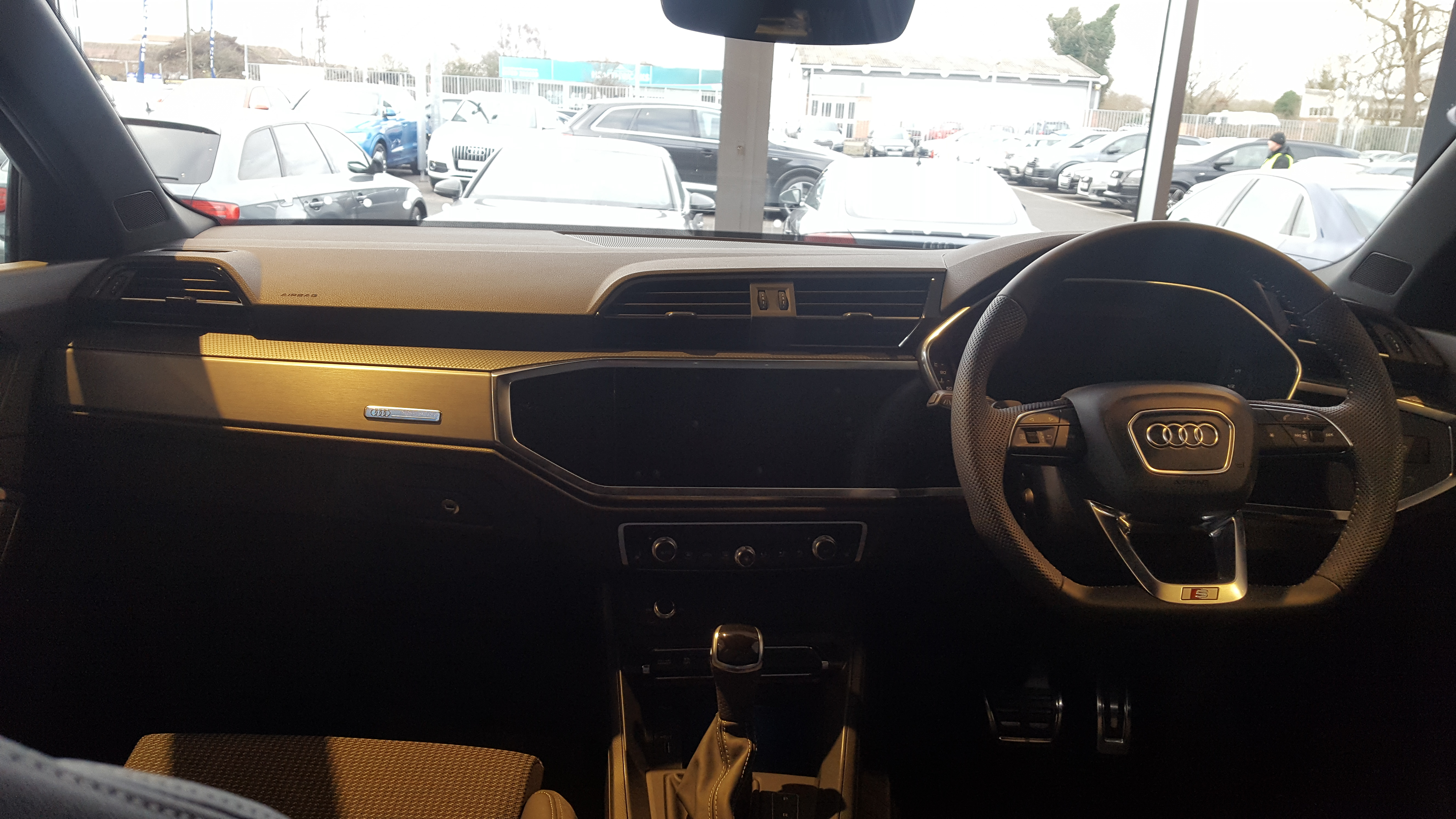
Interior

=== RS Q3 ===
The RS Q3 variant was revealed in September 2019; it has the same engine as the first-generation RS Q3 albeit with more power.

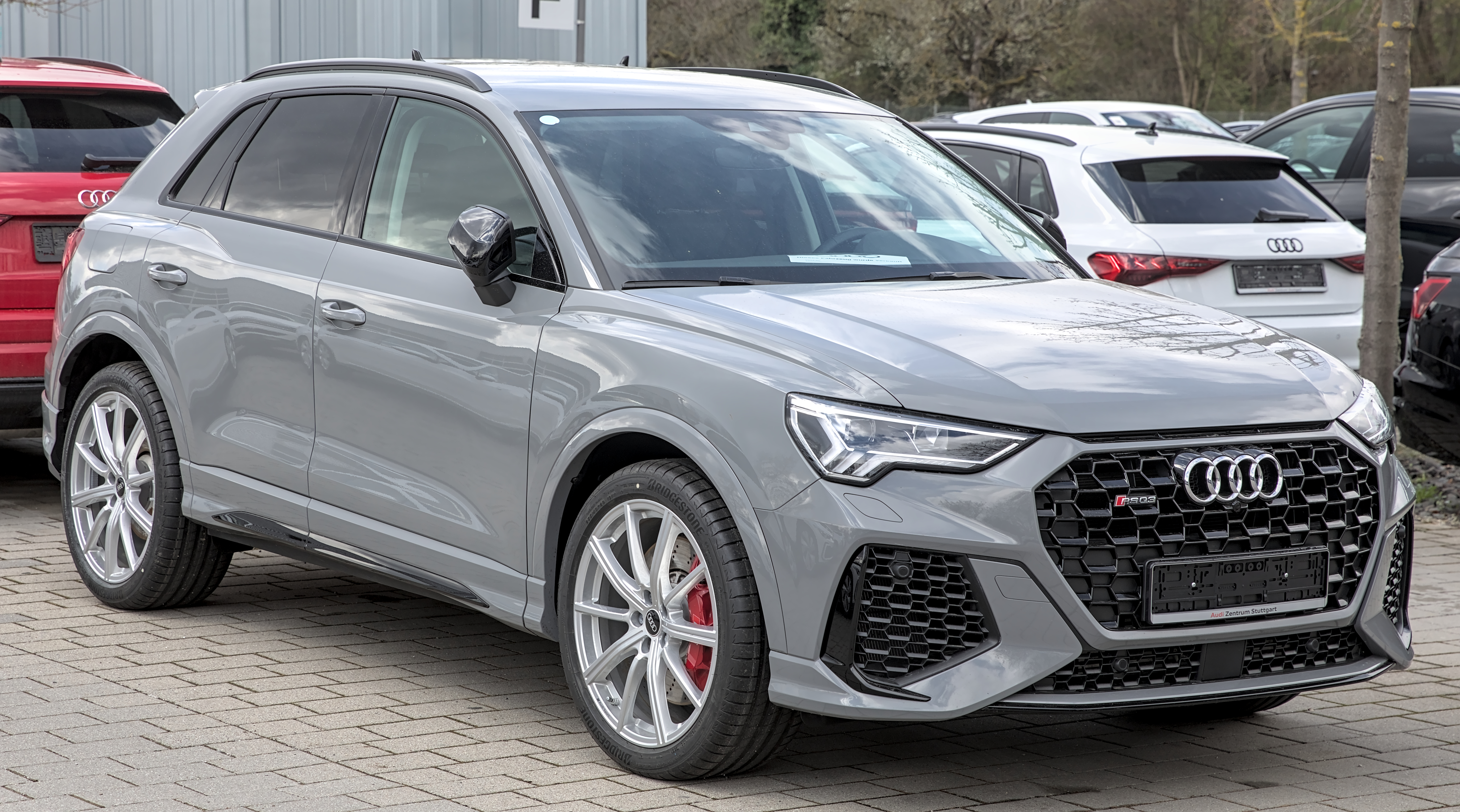
RS Q3

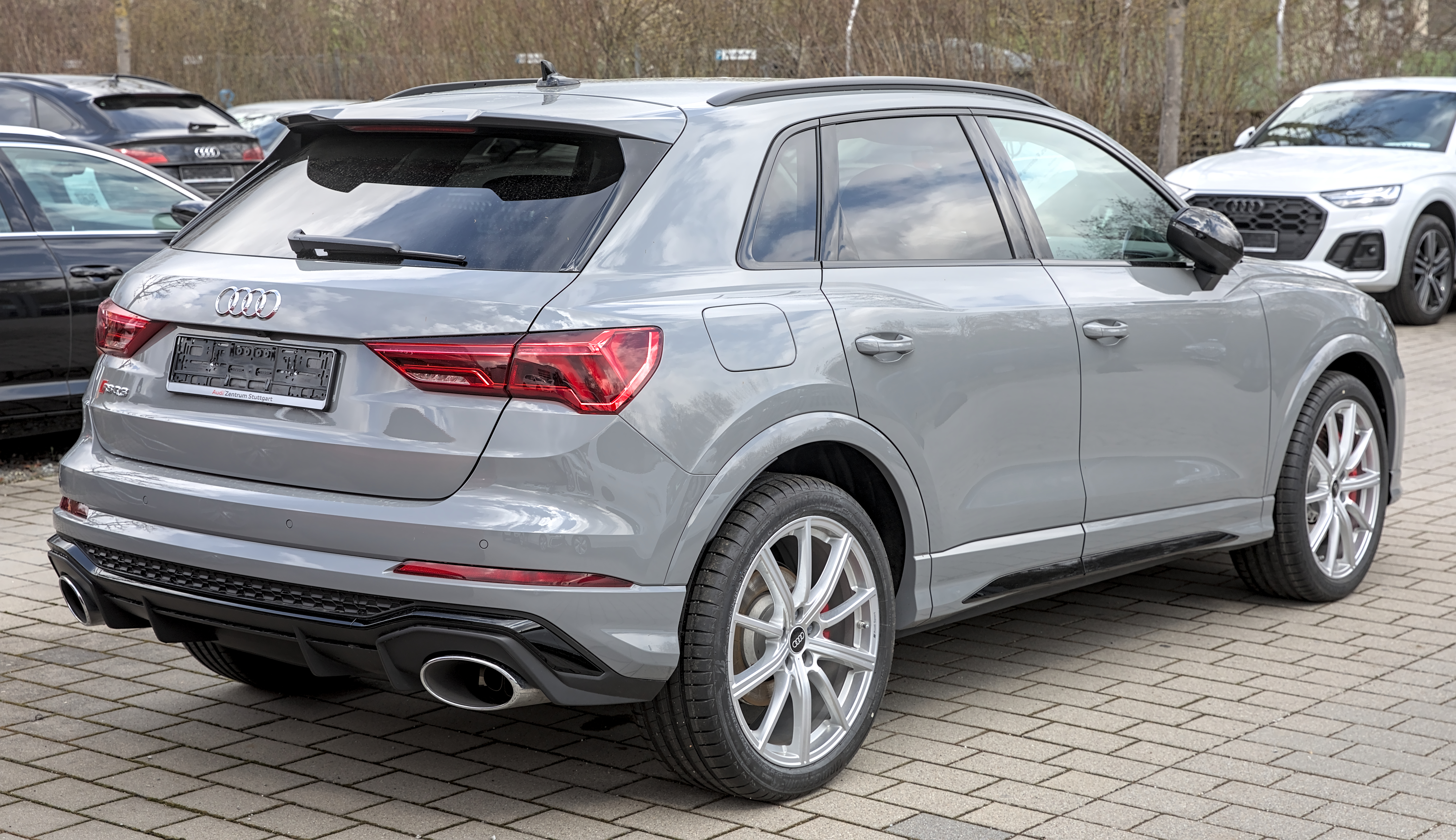
Rear view

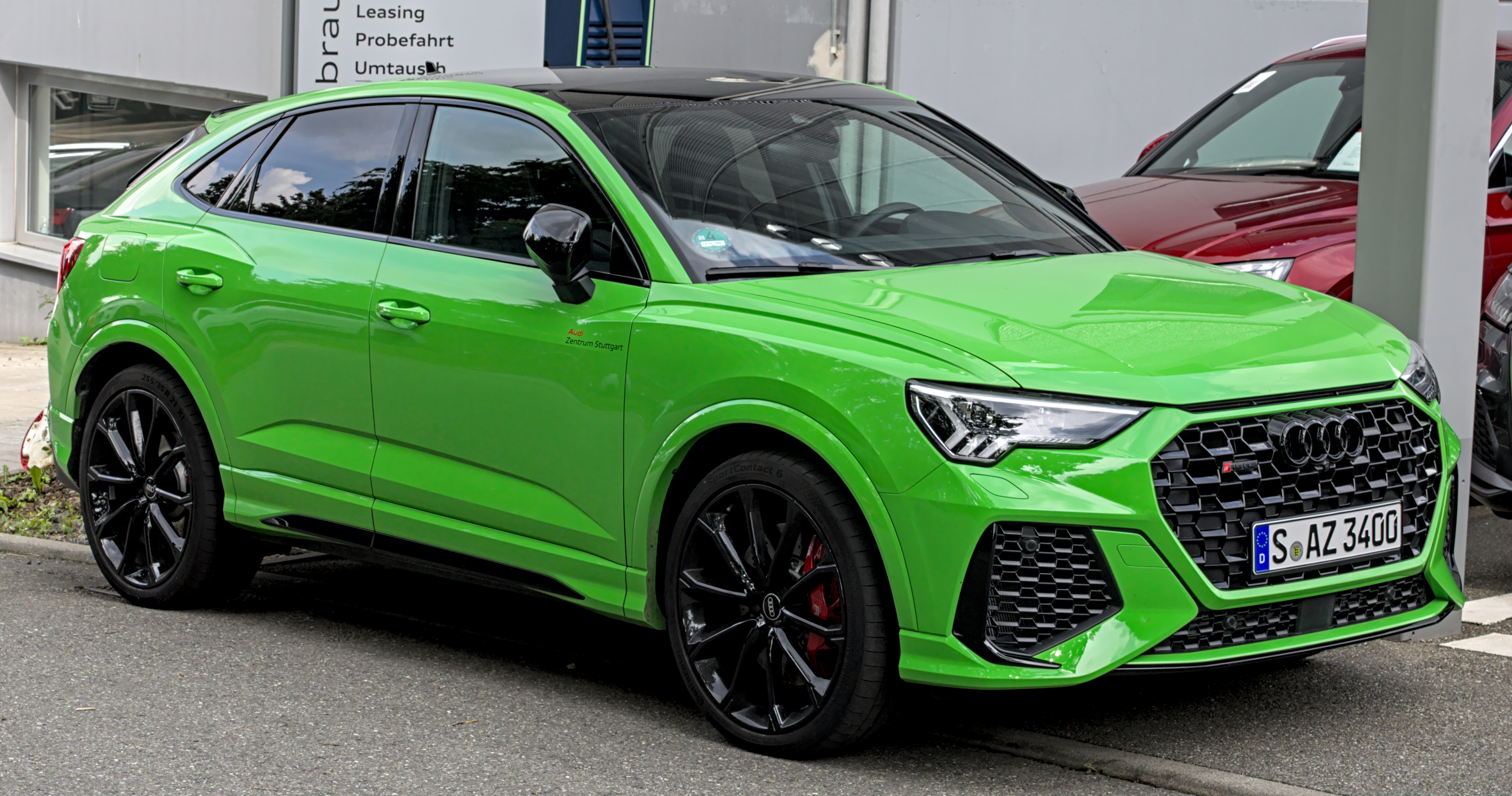
RS Q3 Sportback

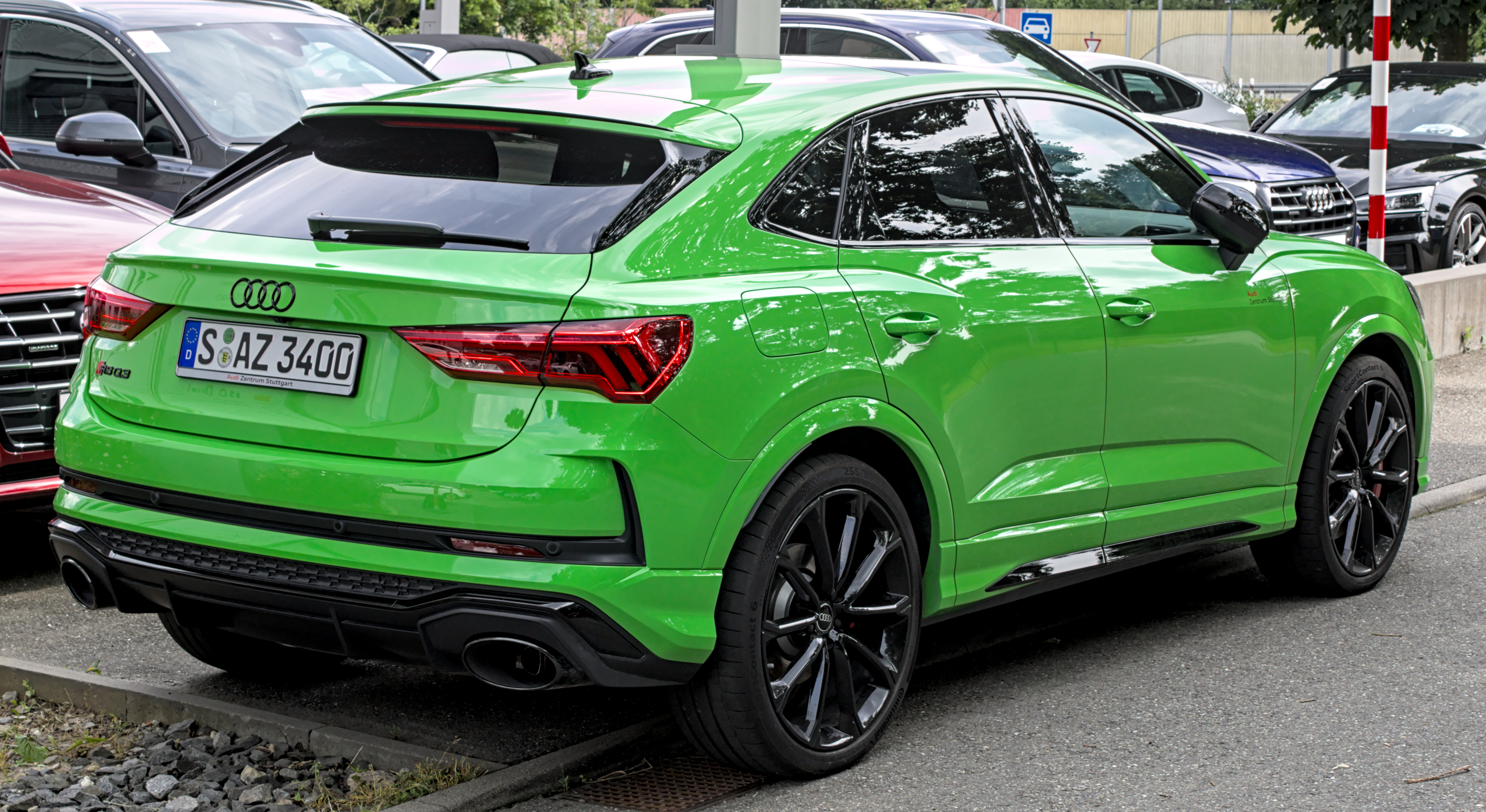
Rear view (Sportback)

==== RS Q3 Edition 10 Years ====
Announced in October 2022, the Audi RS Q3 Edition 10 Years is a special edition with some visual changes, such as blacked-out trim, and only 555 units will be built.

=== Safety ===
ANCAP test results* Audi Q3 (2018, aligned with Euro NCAP)
| Test | Points | % |
|---|---|---|
| Overall: | 5 /5 stars | |
| Adult occupant: | 36.2 | 95% |
| Child occupant: | 43.4 | 88% |
| Pedestrian: | 36.7 | 76% |
| Safety assist: | 11.1 | 85% |

Euro NCAP test results* Audi Q3 (2019)
| Test | Points | % |
|---|---|---|
| Overall: | 5 /5 stars | |
| Adult occupant: | 36.2 | 95% |
| Child occupant: | 42.5 | 86% |
| Pedestrian: | 36.7 | 76% |
| Safety assist: | 11.1 | 85% |

== Third generation (Typ FJ; 2025) ==
Third generation
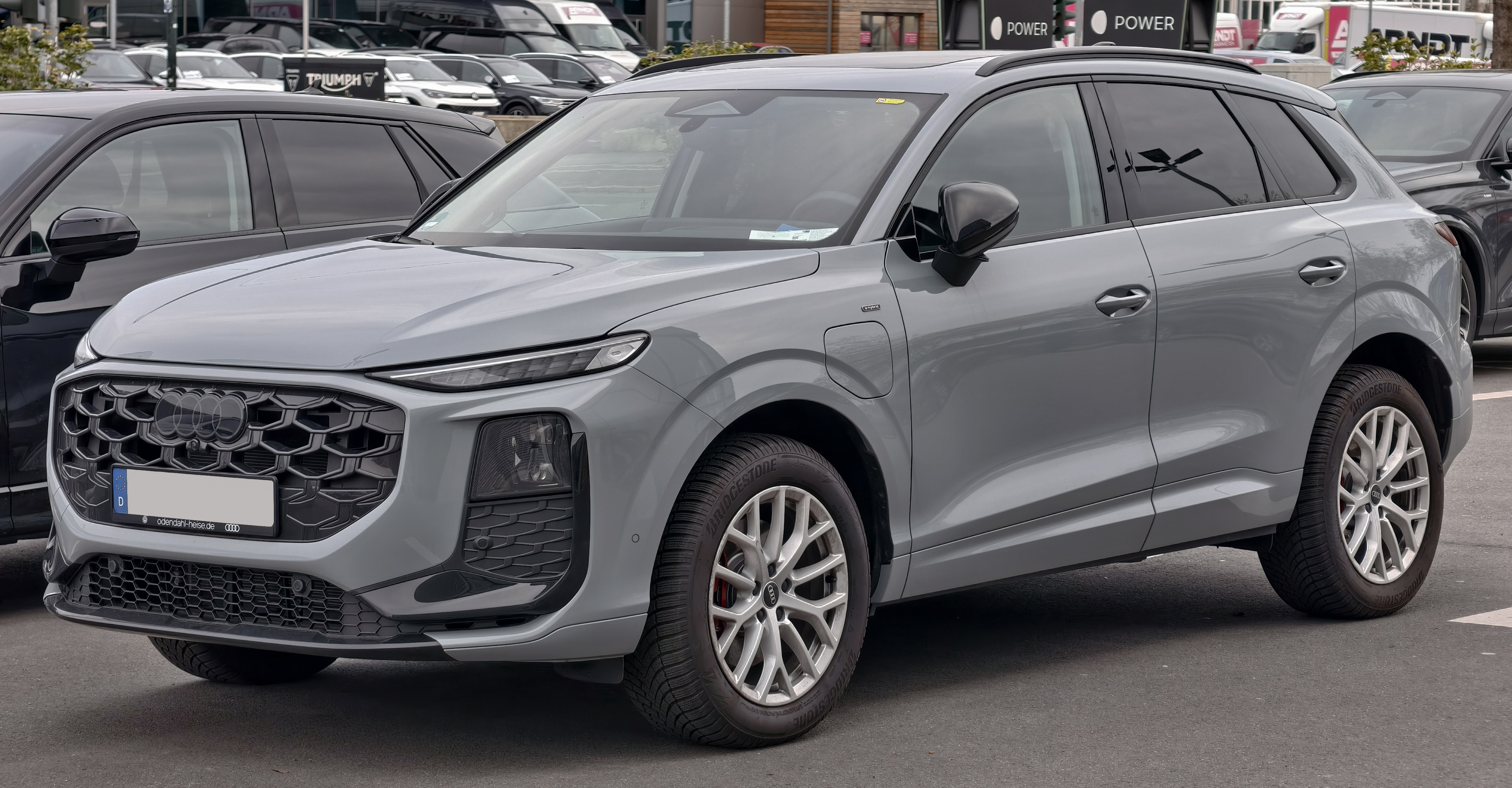

Overview
- Model code: FJ
- Production: July 2025 – present
- Model years: 2026–present
- Assembly: Hungary: Gyor; Germany: Ingolstadt (Audi AG Werk Ingolstadt); China: Tianjin (FAW-VW); India: Aurangabad (SAVWIPL plant)
- Designer: Ramon Sellers, Seulah Park

Body and chassis
- Body style: 5-door SUV; 5-door coupé SUV (Sportback)
- Platform: Volkswagen Group MQB Evo
- Related: Cupra Terramar; Škoda Kodiaq Mk2; Volkswagen Tiguan MK3; Volkswagen Tayron Mk2

Powertrain
- Engine: Petrol; 1.5L TFSI I4; 2.0L TFSI I4; Diesel; 2.0L TDI I4; Petrol PHEV; 1.5L TFSI I4
- Transmission: 7-speed dual-clutch (S-tronic)
- Hybrid drivetrain: Plug-in hybrid
- Battery: 19.7 kW
- Electric range: 75 mi (121 km)
- Plug-in charging: 50 kW fast-charging

Dimensions
- Wheelbase: 2,682 mm (105.6 in); 2,791 mm (109.9 in) (Q3L)
- Length: 4,531 mm (178.4 in); 4,643 mm (182.8 in) (Q3L)
- Width: 1,859 mm (73.2 in); 1,862 mm (73.3 in) (Q3L)
- Height: 1,600 mm (63.0 in); 1,623 mm (63.9 in) (Q3L)

The third generation Q3 was unveiled on 16 June 2025. The model takes design inspiration from the third-generation Q5. Sales in Germany set to commence in late 2025.

The coupé SUV model, marketed as the Q3 Sportback, was unveiled on 25 August 2025.

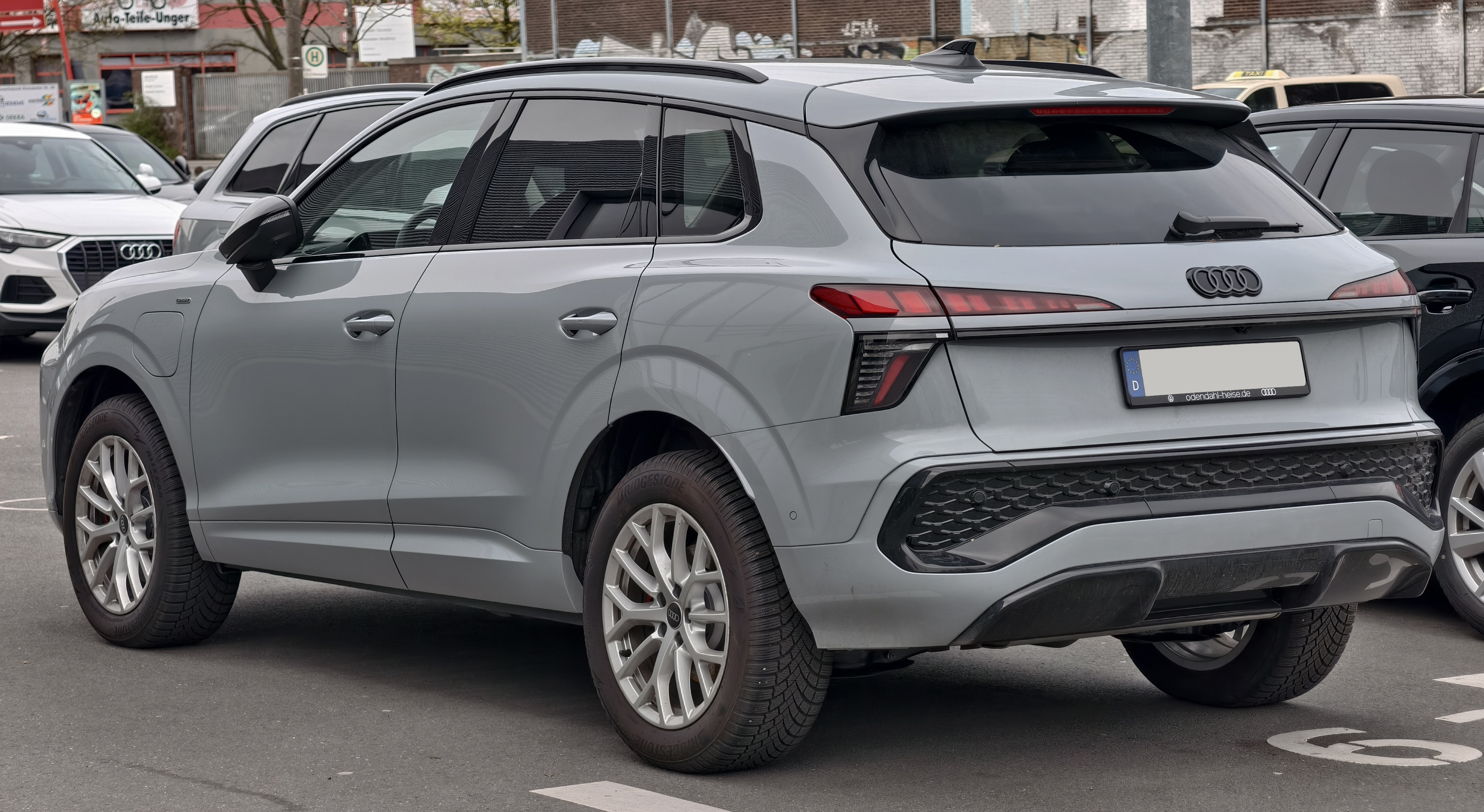
Rear view

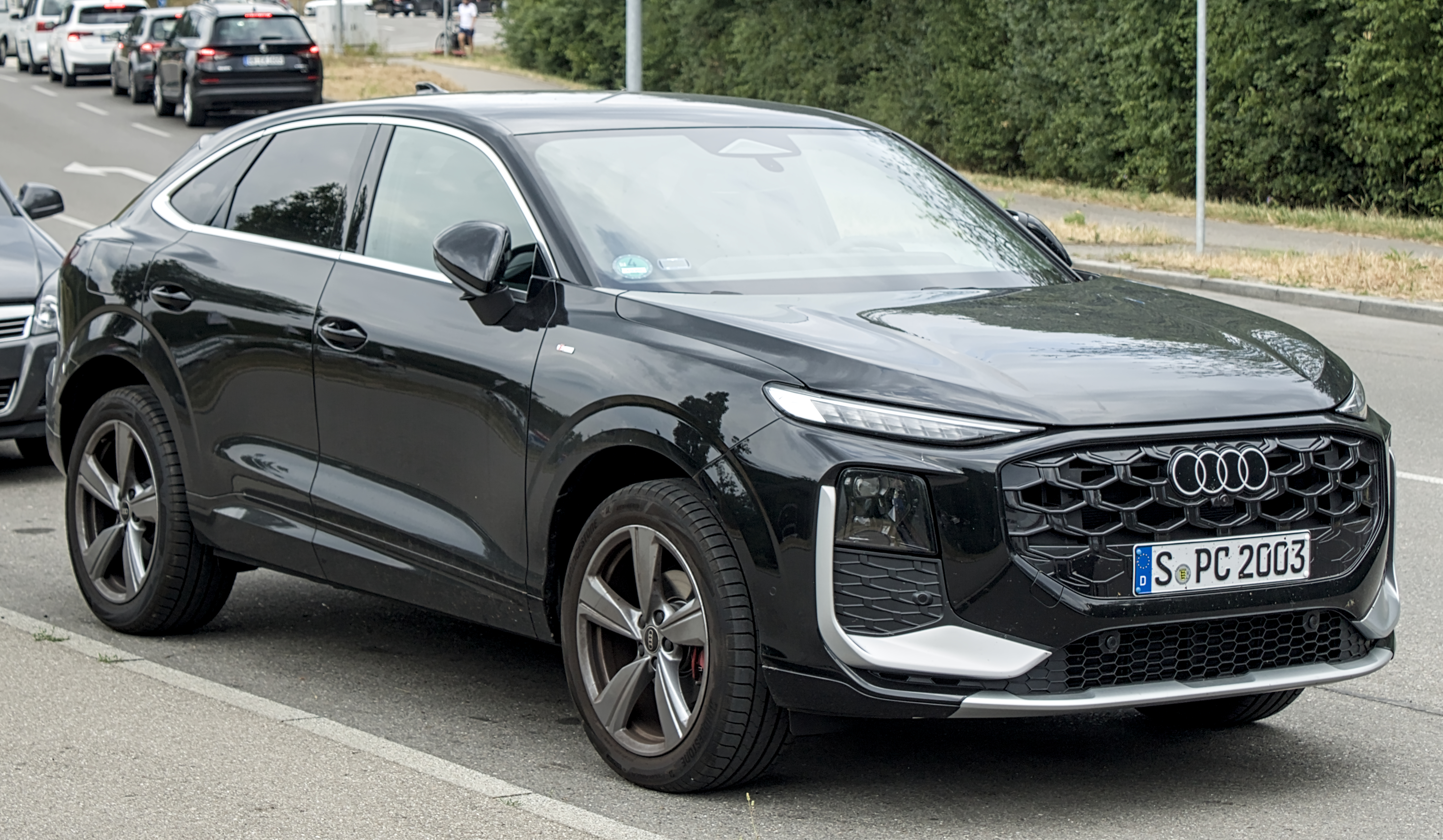
Q3 Sportback

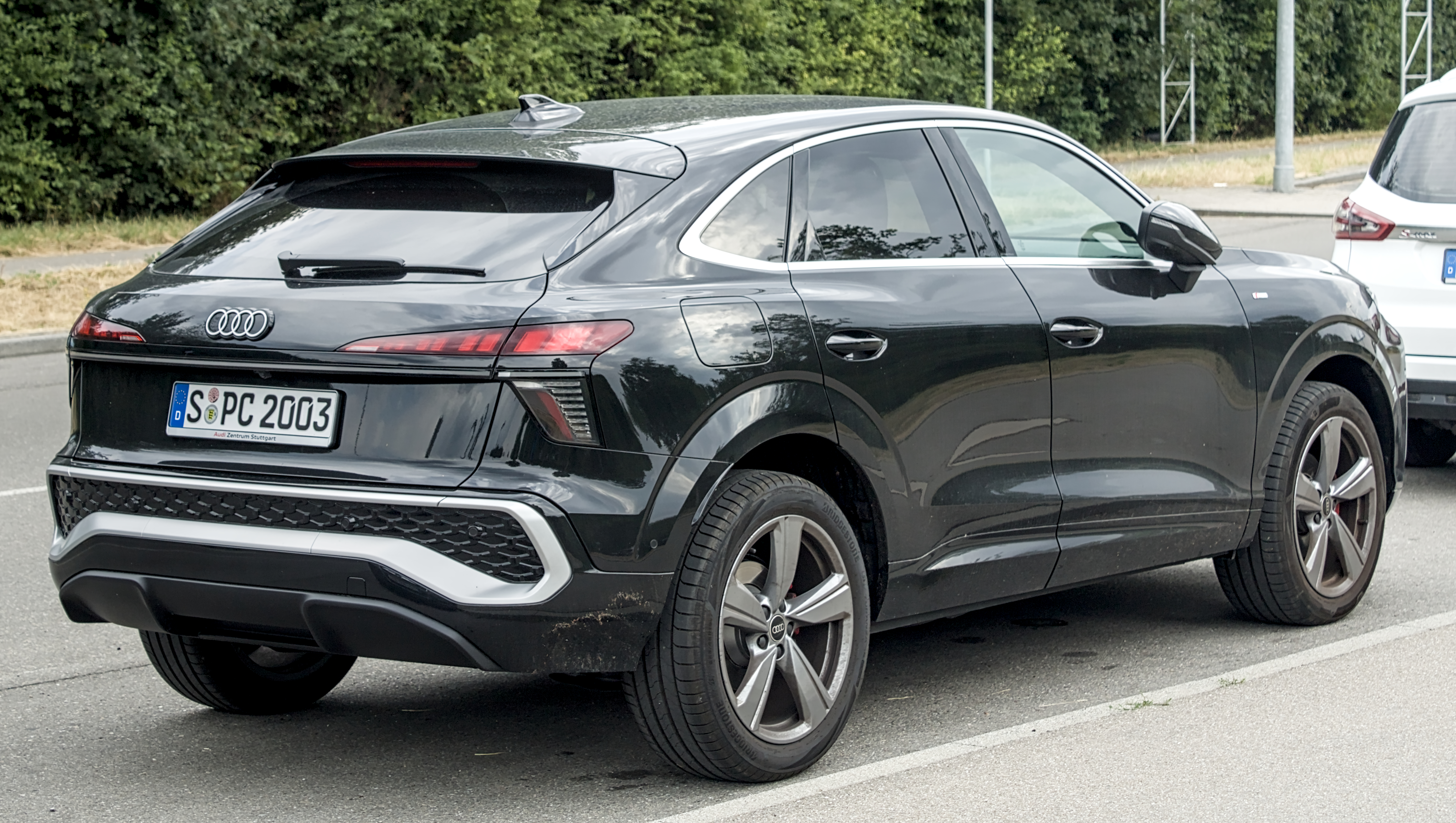
Rear view (Sportback)

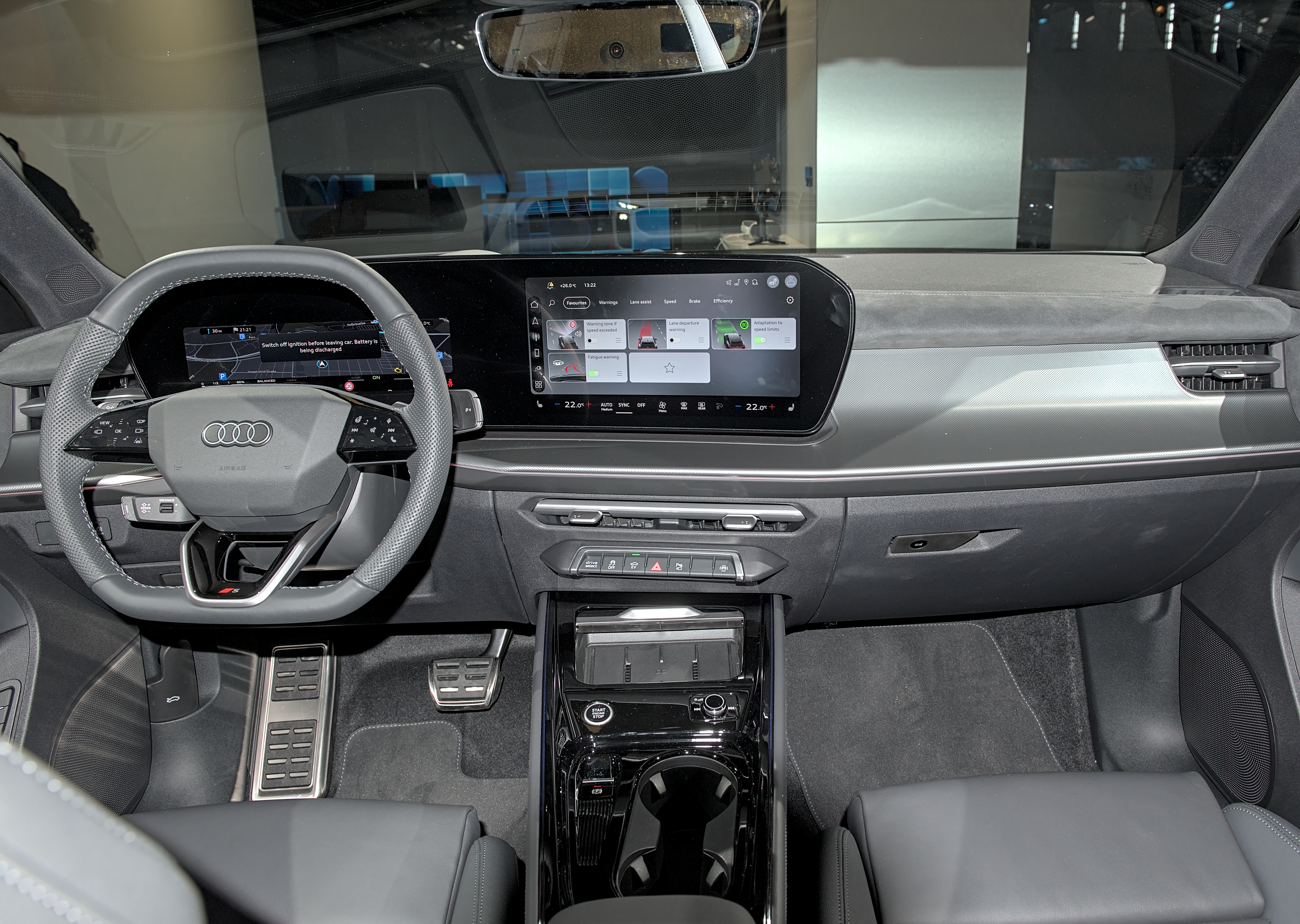
Interior

=== Features ===
There are three suspension designs for the third-generation Q3. Instead of the shifter being mounted on the centre console it is mounted on the steering column. Additional features include a 12-speaker system, ambient lighting on the doors, a 12-inch infotainment system, a 11.9-inch digital cluster, and a 15w phone charger.

=== Powertrain ===
There were four powertrain options were confirmed at launch. These include 1.5 and 2.0-litre turbocharged inline-4 petrol engines, a 2.0-litre diesel engine, and the 1.5-litre turbocharged petrol engine paired with a plug-in hybrid powertrain.

These engines are shared with the third-generation Volkswagen Tiguan.

No all-wheel drive versions of the plug-in hybrid and diesel models were confirmed at launch. All-wheel-drive is only available with the 2.0-litre turbocharged petrol engine.

=== Safety ===
Euro NCAP test results Audi Q3 SUV TFSI 110 kW (LHD) (2025)
| Test | Points | % |
|---|---|---|
| Overall: | 5 /5 stars | |
| Adult occupant: | 35.0 | 87% |
| Child occupant: | 42.5 | 86% |
| Pedestrian: | 51.0 | 80% |
| Safety assist: | 14.1 | 78% |

ANCAP test results Audi Q3 (2025, aligned with Euro NCAP)
| Test | Points | % |
|---|---|---|
| Overall: | 5 /5 stars | |
| Adult occupant: | 35.00 | 87% |
| Child occupant: | 41.54 | 86% |
| Pedestrian: | 50.97 | 80% |
| Safety assist: | 15.09 | 83% |

== Sales ==
| Year | China | | | US |
| Year | Q3 | Sportback | Total | US |
|---|---|---|---|---|
| 2023 | 49,696 | 8,554 | 58,250 | 22,189 |
| 2024 | 41,652 | 2,723 | 44,375 | 32,090 |
| 2025 | 32,478 | 2,444 | 34,922 | 23,581 |
