= E3 (disambiguation) =

E3 was a video game industry event held in Los Angeles, US.

E3, E.III, E03, E-3, E_{3} or E^{3} may also refer to:

== Arts and entertainment ==
- E_{3}, the third octave of the musical note E
- E3 (album), 2023 album by Midwxst
- Every Extend Extra, a video game

== Military ==
- Boeing E-3 Sentry, an AWACS aircraft based on the Boeing 707
- Fokker E.III, a 1915 Dutch fighter aircraft
- HMS E3, an E-class submarine of the British Royal Navy
- Pfalz E.III, a German aircraft
- Siemens-Schuckert E.III, a German aircraft
- E-3 (rank), a paygrade in the US military

== Organizations ==
- EU three – Germany, France, and Italy – the three European Union countries with the largest populations and economies
- the three European signaturies to the Iranian nuclear agreement: France, Germany and the United Kingdom
- Economics for Equity and the Environment Network, a nonprofit organization based in Portland, Oregon, US
- e3 Filing, a Regulatory Filing department within Computershare

== Places ==
- E3, a postcode district in the E postcode area for east London, England
- Wauwilermoos pile dwelling settlement (Egolzwil 3), a prehistoric settlement in Switzerland

== Science and technology ==
=== Science ===
- E3 binding protein, a metabolic protein
- Estriol (E3), an estrogen sex hormone
- E3 Ubiquitin ligase, a protein component of proteasome-mediated protein degradation
- Dihydrolipoamide dehydrogenase, the third element of the pyruvate dehydrogenase complex
- C/2022 E3 (ZTF), a comet
- Haplogroup E3 (Y-DNA), a human Y-chromosome DNA haplogroup

=== Technology ===
- E-3 process, an obsolete film developing method for photographic transparency film
- E3 series (number series), for electronic components
- Honda E3, a 1991 Honda E series ASIMO predecessor robot
- Olympus E-3, a digital SLR camera
- E3, a communications channel defined in the E-carrier standard

== Transportation ==
=== Road ===
- E03 expressway (Sri Lanka), Colombo–Katunayake Expressway in Sri Lanka
- Second Link Expressway (route E3), in Johor, Malaysia
- Manila–Cavite Expressway (route E3), in Philippines
- Kyushu Expressway, numbered as E3 in Japan
- European route E3, a European route
- London Buses route E3, a bus route in London
- E3, a Mazda E engine
- BMW E3, a German automobile
- Chery E3, a Chinese saloon

=== Rail ===
- E3 Series Shinkansen, a Japanese high-speed train
- EMC E3, a diesel locomotive
- LB&SCR E3 class, an 1894 British class of steam locomotives

=== Air ===
- New Gen Airways (former IATA code: E3), a former Thai airline
- EGO Airways (former IATA code: E3), a former Italian airline

=== Other ===
- E3 European long distance path, a footpath

== Other uses ==
- E-3 visa, a non-migrant visa allowing Australian citizens to live and work in the US
- 1. e3, White's first move in the Van 't Kruijs Opening in chess
- E3 Harelbeke, a road cycling race in Flanders, Belgium

== See also ==
- EEE (disambiguation)
- 3E (disambiguation)
- Triple E (disambiguation)
