= Err =

Err is the verb form of error.

Err, err, eRR or ERR may refer to:

== Geography ==
- Err, Pyrénées-Orientales, a commune in the Pyrénées-Orientales department, France
- Errachidia Province, Morocco, by ISO 3166-2:MA code
- Piz d'Err, a mountain in the Albula Alps in Switzerland

== Science and technology ==
- err, the ISO 639-1 alpha-2 code for the extinct Erre language
- err, a particular constructor in tagged union data structures
- Estrogen related receptor and particular members of the orphan nuclear receptor family:
  - ERRα
  - ERRβ
  - ERRγ
- European Romantic Review, a scholarly peer-review journal devoted to the interdisciplinary study of nineteenth-century culture

== Other uses ==
- Esther Randriamamonjy, a Malagasy author
- Edmonton Radial Railway, a former streetcar service in Edmonton, Alberta
- Eestimaa Rahvarinne, the Estonian Popular Front
- Eesti Rahvusringhääling, a radio and television organization in Estonia
- Einsatzstab Reichsleiter Rosenberg, a Nazi organization which appropriated cultural property during World War II
- Electronic Regulatory Reporting, a universal regulatory reporting solution
- Epsilon Rho Rho, a fictional fraternity in the "Mars University" episode of Futurama
- Era Alaska, a regional airline which uses the ICAO designation ERR
- Err, a fictional character in the animated comedy Aqua Teen Hunger Force
- Errol Airport, Errol, New Hampshire, by IATA designator

== People with the surname ==
- Lydie Err (born 1949), a Luxembourgish politician

== See also ==
- ER (disambiguation)
- Erro (disambiguation)
- Error (disambiguation)
