= Mitochondrial biogenesis =

Process by which cells build mitochondrial mass

Mitochondrial biogenesis is the process by which cells increase mitochondrial numbers. It was first described by John Holloszy in the 1960s, when it was discovered that physical endurance training induced higher mitochondrial content levels, leading to greater glucose uptake by muscles. Mitochondrial biogenesis is activated by numerous different signals during times of cellular stress or in response to environmental stimuli, such as aerobic exercise.

== Background ==
The ability for a mitochondrion to self-replicate is rooted in its evolutionary history. It is commonly thought that mitochondria descend from cells that formed endosymbiotic relationships with α-protobacteria; they have their own genome for replication. However, recent evidence suggests that mitochondria may have evolved without symbiosis. The mitochondrion is a key regulator of the metabolic activity of the cell, and is also an important organelle in both production and degradation of free radicals. It is postulated that higher mitochondrial copy number (or higher mitochondrial mass) is protective for the cell.

Mitochondria are produced from the transcription and translation of genes both in the nuclear genome and in the mitochondrial genome. The majority of mitochondrial proteins come from the nuclear genome, while the mitochondrial genome encodes parts of the electron transport chain along with mitochondrial rRNA and tRNA. Mitochondrial biogenesis increases metabolic enzymes for glycolysis, oxidative phosphorylation, and ultimately a greater mitochondrial metabolic capacity. However, depending on the available energy substrates and the cell's redox state, the number and size of mitochondria may increase or decrease. Critically, mitochondrial numbers and morphology vary according to cell type and context-specific demand, whereby the balance between mitochondrial fusion/fission regulates mitochondrial distribution, morphology, and function.

== Protein import ==
Mitochondrial proteins encoded from the nuclear genome need to be targeted and transported appropriately into the mitochondria.

Since the majority of mitochondrial protein comes from the nuclear genome, the proteins need to be properly targeted and transported into the mitochondria to perform their functions. First, mRNA is translated in the cell's cytosol. The resulting unfolded precursor proteins will then be able to reach their respective mitochondrial compartments. Precursor proteins will be transported to one of four areas of the mitochondria, which include the outer membrane, inner membrane, intermembrane space, and matrix. All proteins will enter the mitochondria by a translocase on the outer mitochondrial membrane (TOM). Some proteins will have an N-terminal targeting signal, and these proteins will be detected and transported into the matrix, where they will then be cleaved and folded. Other proteins may have targeting information in their sequences and will not include an N-terminal signal. During the past two decades, researchers have discovered over thirty proteins that participate in mitochondrial protein import. As researchers learn more about these proteins and how they reach the respective mitochondrial compartments that utilize them, it becomes evident that there is a multitude of processes that work together in the cell to allow for mitochondrial biogenesis.

== Fusion and fission ==
Mitochondria are highly versatile and are able to change their shape through fission and fusion events. Definitively, fission is the event of a single entity breaking apart, whereas fusion is the event of two or more entities joining to form a whole. The processes of fission and fusion oppose each other and allow the mitochondrial network to constantly remodel itself. If a stimulus induces a change in the balance of fission and fusion in a cell, it could significantly alter the mitochondrial network. For example, an increase in mitochondrial fission would create many fragmented mitochondria, which has been shown to be useful for eliminating damaged mitochondria and for creating smaller mitochondria for efficient transporting to energy-demanding areas. Therefore, achieving a balance between these mechanisms allows a cell to have the proper organization of its mitochondrial network during biogenesis and may have an important role in muscle adaptation to physiological stress.

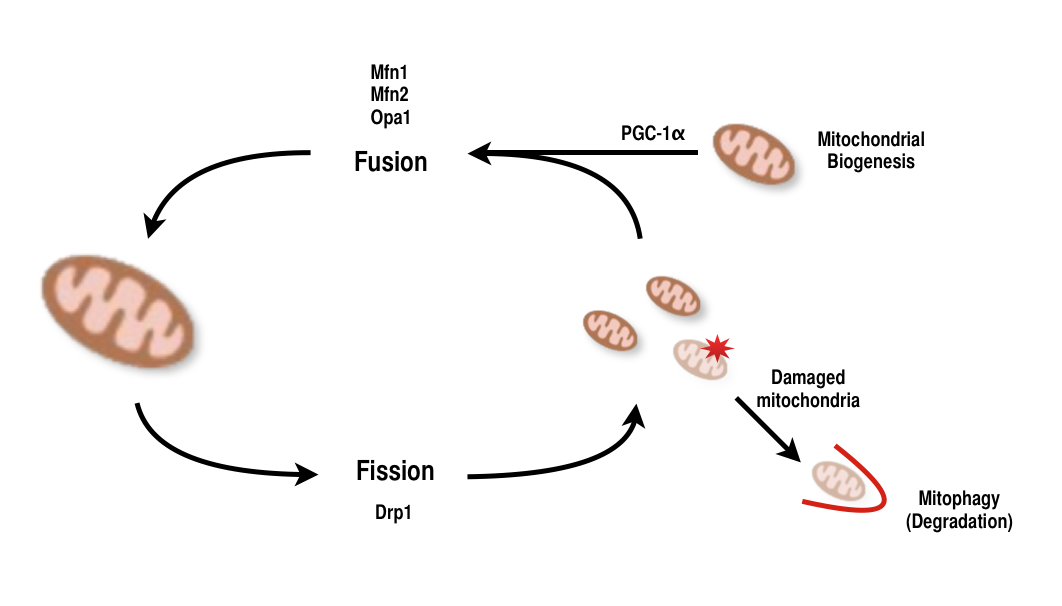
The processes of fusion and fission allow for mitochondrial reorganization.

In mammals, mitochondrial fusion and fission are both controlled by GTPases of the dynamin family. The process of mitochondrial fission is directed by Drp1, a member of the cytosolic dynamin family. This protein forms a spiral around mitochondria and constricts to break apart both the outer and inner membranes of the organelle. On the other hand, the process of fusion is directed by different membrane-anchored dynamin proteins at different levels of the mitochondria. Fusion at the level of the outer mitochondrial membrane is mediated by Mfn1 and Mfn2 (Mitofusins 1 and 2), and fusion at the level of the inner mitochondrial membrane is mediated by Opa1. Multiple research studies have observed correlated increases between mitochondrial respiratory capacity with Mfn1, Mnf2, and Drp1 gene expression after endurance exercises. Therefore, it is supported that reorganization of the mitochondrial network in muscle cells plays an important role in response to exercise.

== Regulation ==
PGC-1α, a member of the peroxisome proliferator-activated receptor gamma (PGC) family of transcriptional coactivators, is the master regulator of mitochondrial biogenesis. It is known to co-activate nuclear respiratory factor 2 (NRF2/GABPA), and together with NRF-2 coactivates nuclear respiratory factor 1 (NRF1). The NRFs, in turn, activate the mitochondrial transcription factor A (tfam), which is directly responsible for transcribing nuclear-encoded mitochondrial proteins. This includes both structural mitochondrial proteins as well as those involved in mtDNA transcription, translation, and repair. PGC-1β, a protein that is structurally similar to PGC-1α, is also involved in regulating mitochondrial biogenesis, but differs in that it does not get increased in response to exercise. While there have been significant increases in mitochondria found in tissues where PGC-1α is overexpressed, as the cofactor interacts with these key transcription factors, knockout mice with disrupted PGC-1α are still viable and show normal mitochondrial abundance. Thus, PGC-1α is not required for normal development of mitochondria in mice, but when put under physiological stress, these mice exhibit diminished tolerance compared to mice with normal levels of PGC-1α. Similarly, in knockout mice with disrupted PGC-1β, the mice showed mostly normal levels of mitochondrial function with decreased ability to adapt to physiological stress. However, a double knockout experiment of PGC-1α/β created mice that died mostly within 24 hours by defects in mitochondrial maturation of cardiac tissue. These findings suggest that while both PGC-1α and PGC- 1β do not each solely establish a cell's ability to perform mitochondrial biogenesis, together they are able to complement each other for optimal mitochondrial maturation and function during periods of physiological stress.

AMP-activated kinase (AMPK) also regulates mitochondrial biogenesis by phosphorylating and activating PGC-1α upon sensing an energy deficiency in muscle. In mice with reduced ATP/AMP ratios that would occur during exercise, the energy depletion has been shown to correlate with AMPK activation. AMPK activation then continued to activate PGC- 1α and NRFs in these mice, and mitochondrial biogenesis was stimulated.

== Aging ==
Mitochondrial biogenesis capacity has been shown to decrease with age, and this decreased mitochondrial function has been associated with diabetes and cardiovascular disease. Aging and disease can induce changes in the expression levels of proteins involved in the fission and fusion mechanisms of mitochondria, thus creating dysfunctional mitochondria. One hypothesis for the detrimental results of aging is associated with the loss of telomeres, the end segments of chromosomes that protect genetic information from degradation. Telomere loss has also been associated with decreased mitochondrial function. Deficiency of telomerase reverse transcriptase (TERT), an enzyme that plays a role in preserving telomeres, has been correlated with activated p53, a protein that suppresses PGC-1α. Therefore, the loss of telomeres and TERT that comes with aging has been associated with impaired mitochondrial biogenesis. AMPK expression has also been shown to diminish with age, which may also contribute to suppressing mitochondrial biogenesis.

== Clinical applications of targeting mitochondrial biogenesis ==
Mitochondrial biogenesis can be targeted to prevent cancer proliferation. Specifically, two biogenesis regulators—PGC1α and c-Myc—can be targeted to prevent cancer proliferation. PGC1α is a key component in mitochondrial biogenesis—as a transcriptional coactivator, it targets multiple transcription factors and the estrogen-related receptor alpha (ERRα). Compounds that target the pathway between PGC1α and ERRα, such as the ERRα inverse agonist, XCT-790, have been found to significantly decrease mitochondrial biogenesis, thus greatly reducing cancer cells’ proliferation and increasing their sensitivity to chemotherapeutic agents. c-Myc, a transcription factor, can be inhibited during its dimerization with Max protein by molecules such as IIA6B17 and omomyc. Inhibition of the c-Myc-Max complex can block the cell cycle and induce apoptosis in cancer cells.
