= Exercise mimetic =

Drugs that have health benefits similar to exercise

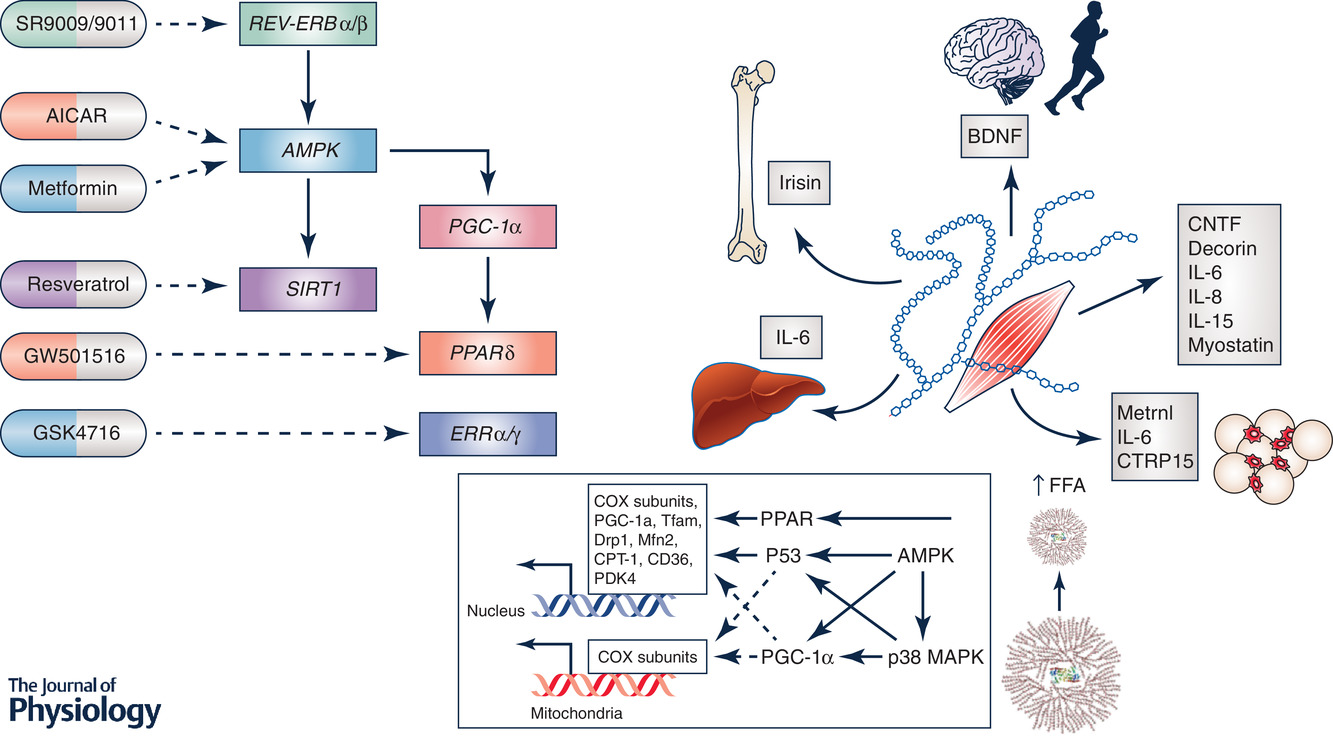
Various exercise mimetics and their effects on pathways also affected by exercise

An exercise mimetic is a drug that mimics some of the biological effects of physical exercise. Exercise is known to have an effect in preventing, treating, or ameliorating the effects of a variety of serious illnesses, including cancer, type 2 diabetes, cardiovascular disease, and psychiatric and neurological diseases such as Alzheimer's disease. As of 2021, no drug is known to have the same benefits.

Known biological targets affected by exercise have also been targets of drug discovery, with limited results. These known targets include:

Targets	Drug candidates
irisin	
brain-derived neurotrophic factor	ACD-856 (PAM of BDNF receptor TrkB)
interleukin-6	
peroxisome proliferator-activated receptor delta	GW501516
PPAR gamma coactivator 1-alpha	
estrogen-related receptor γ/α	GSK4716 SLU-PP-332
NFE2L2	
Canonical transient receptor potential (TRPC) proteins	
Myostatin	myostatin inhibitors

The majority of the effect of exercise in reducing cardiovascular and all-cause mortality cannot be explained via improvements in quantifiable risk factors, such as blood cholesterol. This further increases the challenge of developing an effective exercise mimetic. Moreover, even if a broad spectrum exercise mimetic were invented, it is not necessarily the case that its public health effects would be superior to interventions to increase exercise in the population.

Exogenous administration of cardiotrophin-1 (CT-1) in rodents has been found to mimic the beneficial effects of exercise on the heart in a rodent model of severe right-sided heart failure. CT-1 is under formal development for the treatment of reperfusion injury. It is or was also under development for treatment of acute kidney injury, diabetes mellitus, ischemia, liver failure, and obesity, but no recent development for these indications has been reported.

Lac-Phe and its synthetic alternative ENV-308 are exercise mimetics.
