= Irish (surname) =

Irish is a surname.

Notable people bearing this name include:

- Bill Irish (1932–1992), English lawn and indoor bowler
- Carolyn Tanner Irish (1940–2021), Episcopal Bishop
- Ernest G. Irish (1894–1955), Canadian politician
- Frank Irish (1918–1997), English cricketer who played for Somerset and Devon
- Frederick M. Irish (1870–1941), Arizona football coach 1896–1906
- George Irish (c. 1942–2019), Montserratian academic, professor of Caribbean studies
- Irish Bella, (born 1995), Indonesian actress
- Jane Irish (born 1955), American artist, painter, and ceramicist
- Jim Irish (born 1941), Irish hurler
- John P. Irish (1843–1923), American politician, Iowa Democrat
- Joseph E. Irish (1833–1899), American politician, member of the Wisconsin State Senate
- Lesroy Irish (born 1972), Montserratian cricketer
- Mark Irish (born 1981), English rugby player
- Mark Howard Irish, Canadian politician
- Natalie Irish (born 1982), American visual artist
- Ned Irish (1905–1982), American basketball promoter
- O. H. Irish (Orsamus Hylas Irish; 1830–1883), Chief of the Bureau of Engraving and Printing (1878–1883)
- Ronald Irish (1913–1993), Australian executive

== Fictional characters ==
- Jack Irish, protagonist in a series of novels by Peter Temple

== See also ==
- Irish (disambiguation)
- Irish name
