= Bisphenol AF =

Names
- Preferred IUPAC name 4,4′-(1,1,1,3,3,3-Hexafluoropropane-2,2-diyl)diphenol
- Other names Biphenol AF; Hexafluorobisphenol A; Hexafluorodiphenylolpropane; Bisphenol A hexafluoride; 4,4'-(Hexafluoroisopropylidene)diphenol; Hexafluoroacetone bisphenol A; 2,2-Bis(4-hydroxyphenyl)hexafluoropropane

Identifiers
CAS Number	1478-61-1
3D model (JSmol)	Interactive image
Abbreviations	BPAF
ChemSpider	66498
ECHA InfoCard	100.014.579
PubChem CID	73864
UNII	OH7IX8A37J
CompTox Dashboard (EPA)	DTXSID7037717
- InChI: InChI=1S/C15H10F6O2/c16-14(17,18)13(15(19,20)21,9-1-5-11(22)6-2-9)10-3-7-12(23)8-4-10/h1-8,22-23H Key: ZFVMWEVVKGLCIJ-UHFFFAOYSA-N; InChI=1/C15H10F6O2/c16-14(17,18)13(15(19,20)21,9-1-5-11(22)6-2-9)10-3-7-12(23)8-4-10/h1-8,22-23H Key: ZFVMWEVVKGLCIJ-UHFFFAOYAS
- SMILES: C1=CC(=CC=C1C(C2=CC=C(C=C2)O)(C(F)(F)F)C(F)(F)F)O

Properties
Chemical formula	C_{15}H_{10}F_{6}O_{2}
Molar mass	336.233 g·mol^{−1}
Melting point	162 °C
- Except where otherwise noted, data are given for materials in their standard state (at 25 °C [77 °F], 100 kPa). verify (what is ?) Infobox references

Bisphenol AF (BPAF) is a fluorinated organic compound that is an analogue of bisphenol A in which the two methyl groups are replaced with trifluoromethyl groups. It exists as a white to light-gray powder.

== Biological and Chemical Action ==
Bisphenol AF is an endocrine disrupting chemical. Whereas BPA binds with human estrogen-related receptor gamma (ERR-γ), BPAF all but ignores ERR-γ. Instead, BPAF activates ERR-α and binds to and disables ERR-β.

The chemical shifts in ^{1}H, ^{13}C and ^{19}F NMR spectroscopy are given in the literature.

== Applications ==
Bisphenol AF is used as a crosslinking agent for certain fluoroelastomers and as a monomer for polyimides, polyamides, polyesters, polycarbonate copolymers and other specialty polymers. Polymers containing Bisphenol AF are useful in specialties such as high-temperature composites and electronic materials. Industries include cosmetics, chemical manufacturing, production of metals and rubber. It can also be a plastic additive.

== See also ==
- Bisphenol A
- Bisphenol S
