= Erro =

Erro may refer to:

== People ==
- Erró (born 1932), Icelandic visual artist and painter,
- Luis Enrique Erro (1897–1955), Mexican astronomer
- Enrique Erro (1912–1984), Uruguayan politician
- Eric Roberson (born 1976), American singer and songwriter nicknamed Erro

== Places ==
- Erro, Navarre, Spain
- Erro (river), in Italy
- Erro (crater), a lunar crater named after the astronomer

== See also ==
- Error (disambiguation)
- Err (disambiguation)
- ER (disambiguation)
- "Meu Erro", a song on Os Paralamas do Sucesso's 1984 album O Passo do Lui
