= ERS =

ERS, Ers or ers may refer to:

== Arts and entertainment ==
- Egyptian Ratscrew or Slap, a card game
- Elevator Repair Service, an American theater ensemble

== Finance ==
- ERS10, a share index of the Serbian Banja Luka Stock Exchange
- ERS (insurance company) (formerly Equity Insurance Group), a specialist motor insurer in London, England
- Evaluated Receipt Settlement, a form of invoicing

== Government and politics ==
=== United Kingdom ===
- Electoral Reform Society, a campaign group
  - Electoral Reform Services Ltd., a firm providing balloting services
- NHS e-Referral Service

=== United States ===
- Economic Research Service, a Department of Agriculture agency
- Employees Retirement System of Texas

=== Elsewhere ===
- Electronic Reporting System, for European Union fishing data
- Elektroprivreda Republike Srpske, a Bosnian state-owned utility

== Places ==
- Hers-Mort, a French river (once Ers in English)
- Eros Airport, Namibia (IATA code: ERS)

== Science and technology ==
- Electric road systems, technologies that charge electric vehicles while they drive
- Ellipsoidal reflector spotlight
- Energy recovery system, as found in Formula One, including kinetic energy recovery system
- European Remote-Sensing Satellites
- European Respiratory Society, a professional association of lung physicians
- Exposed riverine sediments

== Other uses ==
- ERS Railways, a Dutch rail freight company
- Ersuic languages, a dialect continuum (ISO 639 code: ERS)
- Ernakulam Junction railway station (station code: ERS) in Kerala, India

== See also ==
- Erse (disambiguation)
- ER (disambiguation)
