= NRF1 =

Protein-coding gene in the species Homo sapiens

Identifiers
- Aliases: NRF1, ALPHA-PAL, nuclear respiratory factor 1
- External IDs: OMIM: 600879; MGI: 1332235; GeneCards: NRF1

Gene location (Human)
Chr.	Chromosome 7 (human)
Band	7q32.2	Start	129,611,720 bp
Band	7q32.2	End	129,757,082 bp

Gene location (Mouse)
Chr.	Chromosome 6 (mouse)
Band	6 A3.3|6 12.47 cM	Start	30,047,987 bp
Band	6 A3.3|6 12.47 cM	End	30,153,457 bp
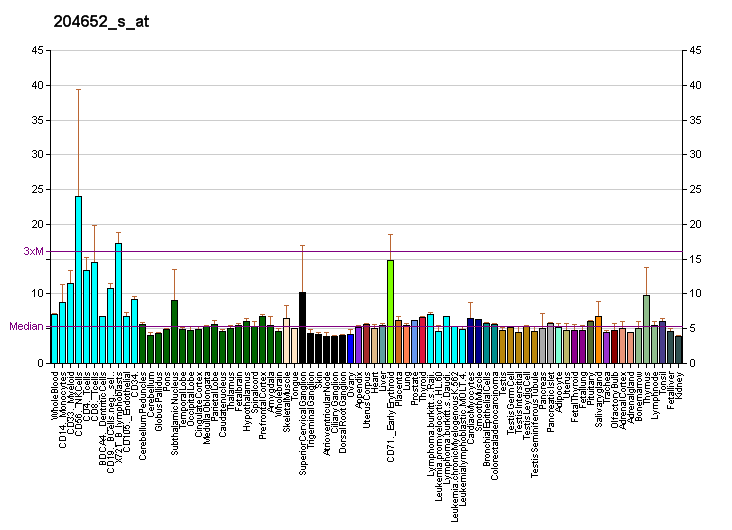

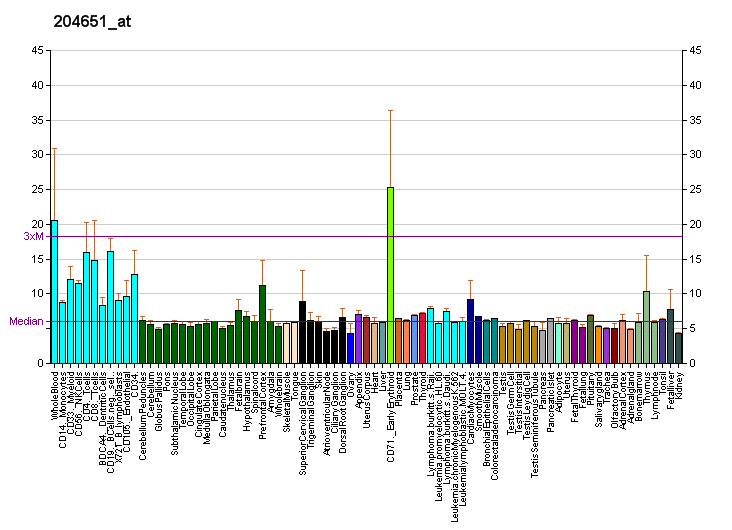

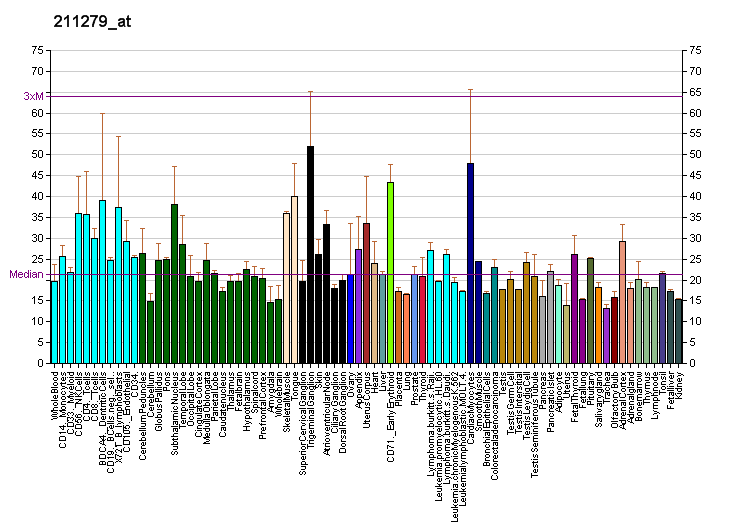
RNA expression pattern
Bgee	Human / Mouse (ortholog); Top expressed in: cerebellar hemisphere; right hemisphere of cerebellum; right uterine tube; ventricular zone; apex of heart; anterior pituitary; granulocyte; ganglionic eminence; sural nerve; gastrocnemius muscle / Top expressed in: zygote; primary oocyte; secondary oocyte; ventricular zone; epiblast; Rostral migratory stream; Paneth cell; granulocyte; thymus; embryo; More reference expression data
BioGPS	More reference expression data
Gene ontology
Molecular function	DNA binding; protein homodimerization activity; DNA-binding transcription activator activity, RNA polymerase II-specific; RNA polymerase II cis-regulatory region sequence-specific DNA binding; protein binding; core promoter sequence-specific DNA binding; RNA polymerase II core promoter sequence-specific DNA binding; DNA-binding transcription factor activity
Cellular component	extracellular exosome; nucleoplasm; cytosol; nucleus
Biological process	regulation of transcription, DNA-templated; regulation of transcription by RNA polymerase II; mitochondrion organization; generation of precursor metabolites and energy; transcription, DNA-templated; positive regulation of transcription by RNA polymerase II; transcription by RNA polymerase II
Sources:Amigo / QuickGO
Orthologs
Databases	NCBI: entry; OMA: entry
Species	Human	Mouse
Entrez	4899	18181
Ensembl	ENSG00000106459	ENSMUSG00000058440
UniProt	Q16656	Q9WU00
RefSeq (mRNA)	NM_005011; NM_001040110; NM_001293163; NM_001293164	NM_001164226; NM_001164227; NM_001164228; NM_001164229; NM_001164230 NM_010938; NM_001361692; NM_001361693; NM_001361694; NM_001361695
RefSeq (protein)	NP_001035199; NP_001280092; NP_001280093; NP_005002	NP_001157698; NP_001157699; NP_001157700; NP_001157701; NP_001157702 NP_035068; NP_001348621; NP_001348622; NP_001348623; NP_001348624
Location (UCSC)	Chr 7: 129.61 – 129.76 Mb	Chr 6: 30.05 – 30.15 Mb
PubMed search
- Wikidata
View/Edit Human	View/Edit Mouse

Nuclear respiratory factor 1, also known as Nrf1, Nrf-1, NRF1 and NRF-1, encodes a protein that homodimerizes and functions as a transcription factor which activates the expression of some key metabolic genes regulating cellular growth and nuclear genes required for respiration, heme biosynthesis, and mitochondrial DNA transcription and replication. The protein has also been associated with the regulation of neurite outgrowth. Alternate transcriptional splice variants, which encode the same protein, have been characterized. Additional variants encoding different protein isoforms have been described but they have not been fully characterized. Confusion has occurred in bibliographic databases due to the shared symbol of NRF1 for this gene and for "nuclear factor (erythroid-derived 2)-like 1" which has an official symbol of NFE2L1.

== Function ==
Nrf1 functions as a transcription factor that activates the expression of some key metabolic genes regulating cellular growth and nuclear genes required for mitochondrial respiration, and mitochondrial DNA transcription and replication. Nrf1, together with Nrf2, mediates the biogenomic coordination between nuclear and mitochondrial genomes by directly regulating the expression of several nuclear-encoded ETC proteins, and indirectly regulating the three mitochondrial-encoded COX subunit genes by activating mtTFA, mtTFB1, and mtTFB2.

Nrf1 is associated with the regulation of neurite outgrowth.

Alternate transcriptional splice variants, which encode the same protein, have been characterized. Additional variants encoding different protein isoforms have been described but they have not been fully characterized.

Cyclin D1-dependent kinase, through phosphorylating NRF-1 at S47, coordinates nuclear DNA synthesis and mitochondrial function.

== Interactions ==
NRF1 has been shown to interact with DYNLL1, PPARGC1A, and PPRC1.
