= Irish =

Irish commonly refers to:

- Someone or something of, from, or related to:
  - Ireland, an island situated off the north-western coast of continental Europe
  - Republic of Ireland, a sovereign state
  - Northern Ireland, a constituent unit of the United Kingdom of Great Britain and Northern Ireland
- Irish language, a Celtic Goidelic language of the Indo-European language family spoken in Ireland
- Irish English, set of dialects of the English language native to Ireland
- Irish people, people of Irish ethnicity

Irish may also refer to:

== Places ==
- Irish Creek (Kansas), a stream in Kansas
- Irish Creek (South Dakota), a stream in South Dakota
- Irish Lake, Watonwan County, Minnesota
- Irish Sea, the body of water which separates the islands of Ireland and Great Britain

== People ==
- Irish (surname), a list of people
- William Irish, pseudonym of American writer Cornell Woolrich (1903–1968)
- Irish Bella, (born 1995) Indonesian actress
- Irish Bob Murphy, Irish-American boxer Edwin Lee Conarty (1922–1961)
- Irish McCalla, American actress and artist Nellie McCalla (1928–2002)
- Irish Meusel, American Major League Baseball player Emil Meusel (1893–1963)
- Irish McIlveen, Northern Ireland-born American Major League Baseball player Henry McIlveen (1880–1960)

== Other uses ==
- Irish (game), historical tables game that was the predecessor of backgammon
- London Irish, a rugby union club in London, sometimes called just "Irish"

== See also ==
- Éire, Irish language name for the island and the sovereign state
- Erse (disambiguation)
