= Estrogen-related receptor =

Orphan nuclear receptor

estrogen-related receptor alpha

Identifiers
- Symbol: ESRRA
- Alt. symbols: ESRL1
- NCBI gene: 2101
- HGNC: 3471
- OMIM: 601998
- RefSeq: NM_004451
- UniProt: P11474

Other data
- Locus: Chr. 11 q12
Search for
- Structures: Swiss-model
- Domains: InterPro

estrogen-related receptor beta

Identifiers
- Symbol: ESRRB
- Alt. symbols: ESRL2
- NCBI gene: 2103
- HGNC: 3473
- OMIM: 602167
- RefSeq: NM_004452
- UniProt: O95718

Other data
- Locus: Chr. 14 q24.3
Search for
- Structures: Swiss-model
- Domains: InterPro

estrogen-related receptor gamma

Identifiers
- Symbol: ESRRG
- NCBI gene: 2104
- HGNC: 3474
- OMIM: 602969
- RefSeq: NM_206595
- UniProt: P62508

Other data
- Locus: Chr. 1 q41
Search for
- Structures: Swiss-model
- Domains: InterPro

Estrogen-related receptors are a family of proteins found in humans and other animals. They function as transcription factors which affect what genes get transcribed and hence what proteins get synthesized. They are part of the nuclear receptor family, but are considered orphan receptors because the identity of their endogenous ligand (if any) has yet to be unambiguously determined.

They are named because of sequence homology with the estrogen receptors (ESR1 and ESR2), but do not appear to bind estrogens or other tested steroid hormones.

There are three human estrogen-related receptors:

- ERRα (ESRRA)
- ERRβ (ESRRB)
- ERRγ (ESRRG)

ERRs bind enhancers throughout the genome where they exert effects on gene regulation. The ERR family exhibit varying transcriptional activation capabilities and physically interact with the transcriptional co-activators PGC1-alpha and PGC1-beta, via their AF-2 domains and the leucine-rich nuclear receptor interacting motifs (LxxLL) present in the PGC-1 proteins, The ERR family have been demonstrated to control energy homeostasis, oxidative metabolism, and mitochondrial biogenesis, while effecting mammalian physiology in the heart, brown adipose tissue, white adipose tissue, placenta, macrophages, and demonstrated additional roles in diabetes and cancer. The contributions of individual ERRs to physiology continue to be elucidated through the generation of sophisticated tissue-specific gene knockout mouse models.
