= Mitochondrial transcription rescue factor 1 =

Protein found in humans

MTRES1

Identifiers
- Aliases: MTRES1, PRED31, HSPC230, chromosome 6 open reading frame 203, mitochondrial transcription rescue factor 1, C6orf203
- External IDs: MGI: 1915101; GeneCards: MTRES1

Gene location (Human)
Chr.	Chromosome 6 (human)
Band	6q21	Start	107,028,199 bp
Band	6q21	End	107,051,586 bp

Gene location (Mouse)
Chr.	Chromosome 10 (mouse)
Band	10|10 B2	Start	43,401,129 bp
Band	10|10 B2	End	43,416,990 bp
RNA expression pattern
Bgee	Human / Mouse (ortholog); Top expressed in: oocyte; tendon of biceps brachii; secondary oocyte; mucosa of transverse colon; biceps brachii; vastus lateralis muscle; right adrenal gland; right adrenal cortex; muscle of thigh; internal globus pallidus / Top expressed in: motor neuron; digastric muscle; sternocleidomastoid muscle; facial motor nucleus; temporal muscle; morula; triceps brachii muscle; intercostal muscle; vastus lateralis muscle; myocardium of ventricle; More reference expression data
BioGPS	n/a
Orthologs
Databases	NCBI: entry; OMA: entry
Species	Human	Mouse
Entrez	51250	67851
Ensembl	ENSG00000130349	ENSMUSG00000019797
UniProt	Q9P0P8	Q9CQF4
RefSeq (mRNA)	NM_001142468; NM_001142470; NM_016487	NM_026411
RefSeq (protein)	NP_001135940; NP_001135942; NP_057571	NP_080687
Location (UCSC)	Chr 6: 107.03 – 107.05 Mb	Chr 10: 43.4 – 43.42 Mb
PubMed search
- Wikidata
View/Edit Human	View/Edit Mouse

Mitochondrial transcription rescue factor 1, also known as C6orf203, is a protein that in humans is encoded by the MTRES1 gene.

C6orf203 protein is reported to be localised to the mitochondria of eukaryotes and possess an evolutionarily conserved RNA-binding domain.

One study propose C6orf203 to associate with mitochondrial RNA polymerase (POLRMT) and increase mitochondrial transcription to protect the cell from mitochondrial RNA loss during stress. However, another study propose C6orf203 to associate with the mitoribosomal large subunit and regulate mitochondrial translation.
