= Irish Creek =

Irish Creek may refer to:

- Irish Creek (Kansas)
- Irish Creek (Schoharie Creek tributary), New York
- Irish Creek (South Dakota)
- Irish Creek (Texas)
- Irish Creek (Berks county Pennsylvania)
