= Yorker (disambiguation) =

In cricket, a yorker is a ball bowled (a delivery) which hits the cricket pitch around the batsman's feet.

Yorker may also refer to:

== People ==
- Jade Yorker, American actor
- Vic Richardson (1894–1969), Australian cricketer nicknamed "Yorker"
- Yorker, demonym for the English city of York

== Other uses ==
- Old Order River Brethren, a Christian denomination formerly sometimes referred to as Yorkers
- Yorker (Vermont), an inhabitant of Vermont who held that Vermont was a part of New York state, during a dispute 1770s and 1780s
- Yorker International University, a university based in the United States with campuses around the world

== See also ==
- New Yorker (disambiguation)
