= POLRMT =

Protein-coding gene in the species Homo sapiens

Identifiers
- Aliases: POLRMT, APOLMT, MTRNAP, MTRPOL, h-mtRPOL, polymerase (RNA) mitochondrial, RNA polymerase mitochondrial, COXPD55
- External IDs: OMIM: 601778; MGI: 1915843; GeneCards: POLRMT
Available structures
PDB	Ortholog search: PDBe RCSB
PDB	List of PDB id codes 3SPA, 4BOC
Enzyme activity
EC #	BRENDA	ExPASy	KEGG	MetaCyc
2.7.7.6	↗	↗	↗	↗

Gene location (Human)
Chr.	Chromosome 19 (human)
Band	19p13.3	Start	617,221 bp
Band	19p13.3	End	633,537 bp

Gene location (Mouse)
Chr.	Chromosome 10 (mouse)
Band	10|10 C1	Start	79,571,957 bp
Band	10|10 C1	End	79,582,415 bp
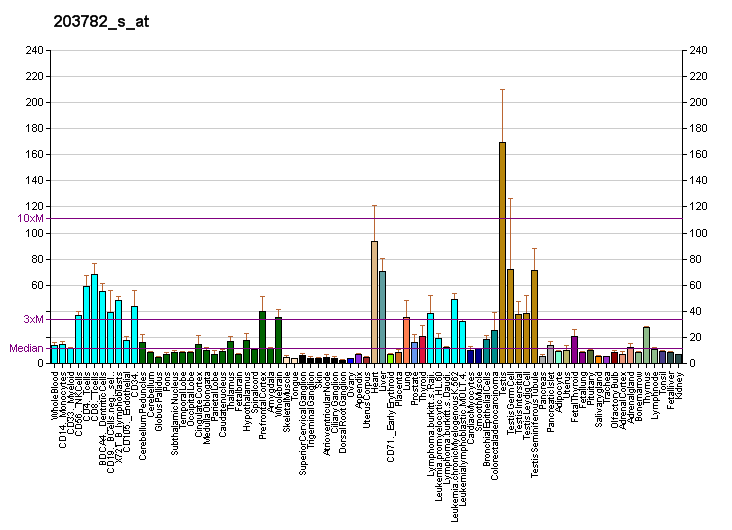

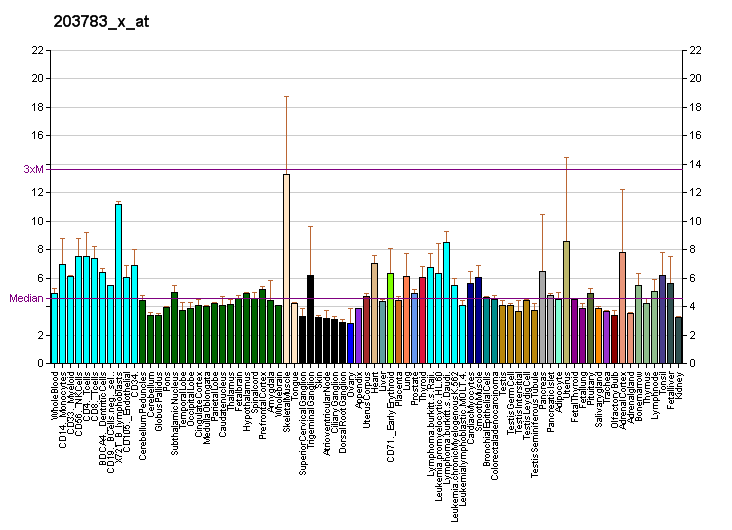
RNA expression pattern
Bgee	Human / Mouse (ortholog); Top expressed in: left testis; right testis; apex of heart; testicle; mucosa of transverse colon; gonad; muscle of thigh; right lobe of liver; gastrocnemius muscle; anterior pituitary / Top expressed in: right ventricle; internal carotid artery; external carotid artery; temporal muscle; primary oocyte; sternocleidomastoid muscle; triceps brachii muscle; muscle of thigh; motor neuron; digastric muscle; More reference expression data
BioGPS	More reference expression data
Gene ontology
Molecular function	DNA-directed 5'-3' RNA polymerase activity; transferase activity; DNA binding; nucleotidyltransferase activity; protein binding; RNA binding; mitochondrial promoter sequence-specific DNA binding; sequence-specific DNA binding
Cellular component	mitochondrial matrix; mitochondrial nucleoid; mitochondrion; mitochondrial DNA-directed RNA polymerase complex; protein-containing complex
Biological process	mitochondrial transcription; transcription initiation from mitochondrial promoter; mitochondrion organization; transcription, DNA-templated
Sources:Amigo / QuickGO
Orthologs
Databases	NCBI: entry; OMA: entry
Species	Human	Mouse
Entrez	5442	216151
Ensembl	ENSG00000099821	ENSMUSG00000020329
UniProt	O00411	Q8BKF1
RefSeq (mRNA)	NM_005035	NM_172551
RefSeq (protein)	NP_005026	NP_766139; NP_001394721; NP_001394722; NP_001394723; NP_001394724 NP_001394725; NP_001394726; NP_001394727; NP_001394728
Location (UCSC)	Chr 19: 0.62 – 0.63 Mb	Chr 10: 79.57 – 79.58 Mb
PubMed search
- Wikidata
View/Edit Human	View/Edit Mouse

DNA-directed RNA polymerase, mitochondrial is an enzyme that in humans is encoded by the POLRMT gene.

== Function ==
This gene encodes a mitochondrial DNA-directed RNA polymerase. The gene product is responsible for mitochondrial gene expression as well as for providing RNA primers for initiation of replication of the mitochondrial genome. Although this polypeptide has the same function as the three nuclear DNA-directed RNA polymerases, it is more closely related to RNA polymerases of bacteriophage (including T7 RNA polymerase), mitochondrial polymerases of lower eukaryotes as well as chloroplastic RpoT polymerases.

== Structure ==
The structure of the enzyme has been solved. It exhibits an overall structure similar to that of phage RNAP, but the initiation mechanism is different in that it requires initiation factors TFAM (only in mammals) and TFB2M. Elongation requires the elongation factor TEFM. The exact termination process is less understood, but MTERF1 is thought to play a role.
