= Lac-Phe =

Names
- IUPAC name (2S)-2-[[(2S)-2-hydroxypropanoyl]amino]-3-phenylpropanoic acid
- Other names N-[(S)-lactoyl]-L-phenylalaninate; N-Lactoyl-phenylalanine; N-Lactoylphenylalanine

Identifiers
CAS Number	183241-73-8
3D model (JSmol)	Interactive image
ChEBI	CHEBI:174217
ChemSpider	9250603
PubChem CID	11075454
- InChI: InChI=1S/C12H15NO4/c1-8(14)11(15)13-10(12(16)17)7-9-5-3-2-4-6-9/h2-6,8,10,14H,7H2,1H3,(H,13,15)(H,16,17)/t8-,10-/m0/s1 Key: IIRJJZHHNGABMQ-WPRPVWTQSA-N
- SMILES: C[C@@H](C(=O)N[C@@H](CC1=CC=CC=C1)C(=O)O)O

Properties
Chemical formula	C_{12}H_{15}NO_{4}
Molar mass	237.255 g·mol^{−1}

Related compounds
Related N-acyl-alpha-amino acids	N-Acetylaspartic acid N-acetylcysteine; N-Acetylglutamic acid N-Acetylglutamine; N-Acetylleucine; N-formylmethionine
Related compounds	Lactamide
- Except where otherwise noted, data are given for materials in their standard state (at 25 °C [77 °F], 100 kPa). Infobox references

Lactoylphenylalanine, or Lac-Phe, is an N-lactoyl-amino acid metabolite produced by mammals and microorganisms. In humans, levels are increased by intense exercise and in the inborn error of metabolism phenylketonuria. In mice, high levels of Lac-Phe in the blood cause a decrease of food intake and in humans, its production has been shown to correlate with adipose tissue loss during an endurance exercise intervention. In mammals it is created from (S)-lactate and L-phenylalanine by the cytosol nonspecific dipeptidase (CNDP2) protein. It is classified as N-acyl-alpha-amino acid and pseudodipeptide.

It has also been reported that as an additive, N-L-lactoyl phenylalanine improves the taste of food, conferring an umami flavor. It is found naturally in significant amounts in some traditional Chinese fermented foods such as preserved pickles and soy sauce, and in Parmigiano-Reggiano cheese. Oral intake of Lac-Phe does not have anti-obesity effects in mice, though intraperitoneal injection does reduce food intake and weight gain. Activity dependent cell labeling indicates Lac-Phe activated neural populations in the hypothalamus and brainstem.

Lac-Phe was discovered as a hormone at Stanford University in 2022. It is released during intense exercise and after eating and reduces appetite and obesity in animals. Besides metabolic effects, Lac-Phe has also been found to produce anxiolytic-like effects in rodents, which were associated with dopaminergic and serotonergic signaling as well as reduced hippocampal cytokine expression. Lac-Phe itself has poor pharmacokinetic properties, for instance a short duration. A synthetic alternative known as ENV-308 suitable for once-daily oral administration is described as an exercise mimetic and is under formal clinical development as of 2026.

== See also ==
- Exercise mimetic
- Acyl group
  - Lactoyl, the acyl group derived from lactic acid
- Alpha-amino acid
- Dipeptide
- Dipeptidase
- ENV-308
