= Cytosol nonspecific dipeptidase =

CNDP2
Available structures
PDB	Ortholog search: PDBe RCSB
PDB	List of PDB id codes 4RUH

Identifiers
- Aliases: CNDP2, CN2, CPGL, HEL-S-13, HsT2298, PEPA, CNDP dipeptidase 2 (metallopeptidase M20 family), carnosine dipeptidase 2
- External IDs: OMIM: 169800; MGI: 1913304; HomoloGene: 10085; GeneCards: CNDP2; OMA:CNDP2 - orthologs

Gene location (Human)
Chr.	Chromosome 18 (human)
Band	18q22.3	Start	74,495,816 bp
Band	18q22.3	End	74,523,454 bp

Gene location (Mouse)
Chr.	Chromosome 18 (mouse)
Band	18|18 E4	Start	84,685,590 bp
Band	18|18 E4	End	84,703,827 bp
RNA expression pattern
Bgee	Human / Mouse (ortholog); Top expressed in: kidney tubule; renal medulla; endothelial cell; human kidney; mucosa of ileum; glomerulus; metanephric glomerulus; amniotic fluid; jejunal mucosa; corpus callosum / Top expressed in: vestibular membrane of cochlear duct; right kidney; proximal tubule; Paneth cell; vestibular sensory epithelium; stroma of bone marrow; jejunum; human kidney; internal carotid artery; ileum; More reference expression data
BioGPS	n/a
Gene ontology
Molecular function	carboxypeptidase activity; peptidase activity; hydrolase activity; metallopeptidase activity; dipeptidase activity; metal ion binding; alanylglutamate dipeptidase activity
Cellular component	extracellular exosome; nucleoplasm; cytoplasm; cytosol
Biological process	metabolism; glutathione biosynthetic process; proteolysis
Sources:Amigo / QuickGO
Orthologs
Species	Human	Mouse
Entrez	55748	66054
Ensembl	ENSG00000133313	ENSMUSG00000024644
UniProt	Q96KP4	Q9D1A2
RefSeq (mRNA)	NM_001168499; NM_018235; NM_001370248; NM_001370249; NM_001370250 NM_001370254	NM_001289531; NM_023149
RefSeq (protein)	NP_001161971; NP_060705; NP_001357177; NP_001357178; NP_001357179 NP_001357183	NP_001276460; NP_075638
Location (UCSC)	Chr 18: 74.5 – 74.52 Mb	Chr 18: 84.69 – 84.7 Mb
PubMed search
- Wikidata
View/Edit Human	View/Edit Mouse

Cytosol nonspecific dipeptidase

Identifiers
- EC no.: 3.4.13.18
- CAS no.: 9025-31-4

Databases
- IntEnz: IntEnz view
- BRENDA: BRENDA entry
- ExPASy: NiceZyme view
- KEGG: KEGG entry
- MetaCyc: metabolic pathway
- PRIAM: profile
- PDB structures: RCSB PDB PDBe PDBsum
Search
- PMC: articles
- PubMed: articles
- NCBI: proteins

Cytosolic non-specific dipeptidase (EC 3.4.13.18) also known as carnosine dipeptidase 2 is an enzyme that in humans is encoded by the CNDP2 gene. This enzyme catalyses the hydrolysis of dipeptides, preferentially those containing hydrophobic amino acids. The human enzyme uses manganese ions as a cofactor. In addition to its function as a peptidase, the enzyme also functions to generate N-lactoyl amino acids, such as N-lactoyl-phenylalanine, via the process of "reverse proteolysis". A similar pathway conjugates amino acids to Beta-hydroxybutyric acid.

== See also ==
- N-lactoyl-phenylalanine, a chemical compound produced by this enzyme
