= ENV-308 =

Chemical compound

Clinical data
- Other names: ENV308; ESN-O
- Routes of administration: Oral
- Drug class: Hormonal agent; Lac-Phe mimetic; Exercise mimetic

ENV-308, also known as ESN-O, is a synthetic hormonal agent and exercise mimetic which is under development for the treatment of obesity. It is taken orally.

The drug is a mimic of N-lactoylphenylalanine (Lac-Phe), a hormone discovered at Stanford University in 2022. Lac-Phe is released during intense exercise and after eating and reduces appetite and obesity in animals. This hormone itself has poor pharmacokinetic properties, for instance a short duration. ENV-308 is an improved alternative to Lac-Phe suitable for once-daily oral administration. As a mimic of Lac-Phe, ENV-308 is considered to be an exercise mimetic. The drug has been found to lower leptin levels in animals and humans, with the greatest decreases in people with the highest baseline leptin levels, which is thought to be a marker of improved leptin resistance. Unlike GLP-1 agonists, ENV-308 produced few gastrointestinal side effects.

Besides metabolic effects, Lac-Phe has also been found to produce anxiolytic-like effects in rodents, which were associated with dopaminergic and serotonergic signaling, as well as reduced hippocampal cytokine expression.

ENV-308 is under development by Enveda Biosciences. As of August 2026, it has completed phase 1 clinical trials. A phase 2 trial is being planned. In addition, a trial of the drug for weight loss maintenance in people stopping GLP-1 agonists is being planned. The drug was discovered via Enveda Bioscience's proprietary AI model PRISM. The chemical structure of ENV-308 does not yet appear to have been disclosed.
