= PGC-1α =

Protein-coding gene in the species Homo sapiens

PPARGC1A

Identifiers
- Aliases: PPARGC1A, LEM6, PGC-1(alpha), PGC-1v, PGC1, PGC1A, PPARGC1, PGC-1alpha, PPARG coactivator 1 alpha, PGC-1α
- External IDs: OMIM: 604517; MGI: 1342774; GeneCards: PPARGC1A

Gene location (Human)
Chr.	Chromosome 4 (human)
Band	4p15.2	Start	23,755,041 bp
Band	4p15.2	End	23,904,089 bp

Gene location (Mouse)
Chr.	Chromosome 5 (mouse)
Band	5|5 C1	Start	51,611,592 bp
Band	5|5 C1	End	51,725,068 bp
Orthologs
Databases	NCBI: entry; OMA: entry
Species	Human	Mouse
Entrez	10891	19017
Ensembl	ENSG00000109819	ENSMUSG00000029167
UniProt	n a	O70343
RefSeq (mRNA)	NM_013261	NM_008904
RefSeq (protein)	n/a	NP_032930; NP_001389916; NP_001389917; NP_001389918; NP_001389919 NP_001389920
Location (UCSC)	Chr 4: 23.76 – 23.9 Mb	Chr 5: 51.61 – 51.73 Mb
PubMed search
- Wikidata
View/Edit Human	View/Edit Mouse

Peroxisome proliferator-activated receptor gamma coactivator 1-alpha (PGC-1α) is a protein that in humans is encoded by the PPARGC1A gene. PPARGC1A is also known as human accelerated region 20 (HAR20). It may, therefore, have played a key role in differentiating humans from apes.

PGC-1α is the master regulator of mitochondrial biogenesis. PGC-1α is also the primary regulator of liver gluconeogenesis, inducing increased gene expression for gluconeogenesis.

== Function ==
PPARGC1A is a gene that contains two promoters, and has 4 alternative splicings. PGC-1α is a transcriptional coactivator that regulates the genes involved in energy metabolism. It is the master regulator of mitochondrial biogenesis. This protein interacts with the nuclear receptor PPAR-γ, which permits the interaction of this protein with multiple transcription factors. This protein can interact with, and regulate the activity of, cAMP response element-binding protein (CREB) and nuclear respiratory factors (NRFs). PGC-1α provides a direct link between external physiological stimuli and the regulation of mitochondrial biogenesis, and is a major factor causing slow-twitch rather than fast-twitch muscle fiber types.

Endurance exercise has been shown to activate the PGC-1α gene in human skeletal muscle. Exercise-induced PGC-1α in skeletal muscle increases autophagy and unfolded protein response.

PGC-1α protein may also be involved in controlling blood pressure, regulating cellular cholesterol homeostasis, and the development of obesity.

== Regulation ==
PGC-1α is thought to be a master integrator of external signals. It is known to be activated by a host of factors, including:

1. Reactive oxygen species and reactive nitrogen species, both formed endogenously in the cell as by-products of metabolism but upregulated during times of cellular stress.
2. Fasting can also increase gluconeogenic gene expression, including hepatic PGC-1α.
3. It is strongly induced by cold exposure, linking this environmental stimulus to adaptive thermogenesis.
4. It is induced by endurance exercise and recent research has shown that PGC-1α determines lactate metabolism, thus preventing high lactate levels in endurance athletes and making lactate as an energy source more efficient.
5. cAMP response element-binding (CREB) proteins, activated by an increase in cAMP following external cellular signals.
6. Protein kinase B (Akt) is thought to downregulate PGC-1α, but upregulate its downstream effectors, NRF1 and NRF2. Akt itself is activated by PIP_{3}, often upregulated by PI3K after G protein signals. The Akt family is also known to activate pro-survival signals as well as metabolic activation.
7. SIRT1 binds and activates PGC-1α through deacetylation inducing gluconeogenesis without affecting mitochondrial biogenesis.

PGC-1α has been shown to exert positive feedback circuits on some of its upstream regulators:

1. PGC-1α increases Akt (PKB) and Phospho-Akt (Ser 473 and Thr 308) levels in muscle.
2. PGC-1α leads to calcineurin activation.

Akt and calcineurin are both activators of NF-kappa-B (p65). Through their activation, PGC-1α seems to activate NF-kappa-B. Increased activity of NF-kappa-B in muscle has recently been demonstrated following induction of PGC-1α. The finding seems to be controversial. Other groups found that PGC-1s inhibit NF-kappa-B activity. The effect was demonstrated for PGC-1 alpha and beta.

PGC-1α has also been shown to drive NAD biosynthesis to play a large role in renal protection in acute kidney injury.

== Clinical significance ==
PPARGC1A has been implicated as a potential therapy for Parkinson's disease conferring protective effects on mitochondrial metabolism.

Moreover, brain-specific isoforms of PGC-1alpha have recently been identified which are likely to play a role in other neurodegenerative disorders such as Huntington's disease and amyotrophic lateral sclerosis.

Massage therapy appears to increase the amount of PGC-1α, which leads to the production of new mitochondria.

PGC-1α and beta has furthermore been implicated in polarization to anti-inflammatory M2 macrophages by interaction with PPAR-γ with upstream activation of STAT6. An independent study confirmed the effect of PGC-1 on polarisation of macrophages towards M2 via STAT6/PPAR gamma and furthermore demonstrated that PGC-1 inhibits proinflammatory cytokine production.

PGC-1α has been recently proposed to be responsible for β-aminoisobutyric acid secretion by exercising muscles. The effect of β-aminoisobutyric acid in white fat includes the activation of thermogenic genes that prompt the browning of white adipose tissue and the consequent increase of background metabolism. Hence, the β-aminoisobutyric acid could act as a messenger molecule of PGC-1α and explain the effects of PGC-1α increase in other tissues such as white fat.

PGC-1α increases BNP expression by coactivating Estrogen-related receptor alpha (ERRα) and / or AP1. Subsequently, BNP induces a chemokine cocktail in muscle fibers and activates macrophages in a local paracrine manner, which can then contribute to enhancing the repair and regeneration potential of trained muscles.

Most studies reporting effects of PGC-1α on physiological functions have used mouse models in which the PGC-1α gene is either knocked out or overexpressed from conception. However, some of the proposed effects of PGC-1α have been questioned by studies using inducible knockout technology to remove the PGC-1α gene only in adult mice. For example, two independent studies have shown that adult expression of PGC-1α is not required for improved mitochondrial function after exercise training. This suggests that some of the reported effects of PGC-1α are likely to occur only in the developmental stage.

In the metabolic disorder of combined malonic and methylmalonic aciduria (CMAMMA) due to ACSF3 deficiency, there is a massively increased expression of PGC-1α, which is consistent with upregulated beta oxidation.

== Interactions ==
PPARGC1A has been shown to interact with:

- CREB-binding protein
- Estrogen-related receptor alpha (ERRα), estrogen-related receptor beta (ERR-β), estrogen-related receptor gamma (ERR-γ).
- Farnesoid X receptor
- FBXW7
- MED1, MED12, MED14, MED17,
- NRF1
- Peroxisome proliferator-activated receptor gamma
- Retinoid X receptor alpha
- Thyroid hormone receptor beta

ERRα and PGC-1α are coactivators of both glucokinase (GK) and SIRT3, binding to an ERRE element in the GK and SIRT3 promoters.

== See also ==
- MB-3 (drug)
- PPARGC1B
- Transcription coregulator
