= SLU-PP-332 =

Names
- Preferred IUPAC name 4-Hydroxy-N-[(E)-naphthalen-2-ylmethylideneamino]benzamide
- Other names SLU-PP-332

Identifiers
CAS Number	303760-60-3
3D model (JSmol)	Interactive image
ChEMBL	ChEMBL4208749
ChemSpider	4495508
PubChem CID	5338394
UNII	5YW57G7ADL
- InChI: InChI=1S/C18H14N2O2/c21-17-9-7-15(8-10-17)18(22)20-19-12-13-5-6-14-3-1-2-4-16(14)11-13/h1-12,21H,(H,20,22)/b19-12+ Key: RNZIMBFHRXYRLL-XDHOZWIPSA-N
- SMILES: C1=CC=C2C=C(C=CC2=C1)/C=N/NC(=O)C3=CC=C(C=C3)O

Properties
Chemical formula	C_{18}H_{14}N_{2}O_{2}
Molar mass	290.322 g·mol^{−1}
- Except where otherwise noted, data are given for materials in their standard state (at 25 °C [77 °F], 100 kPa). Infobox references

SLU-PP-332 is a compound which is a potent but non-selective estrogen-related receptor (ERR) agonist, acting most strongly at ERRα with an EC_{50} of 98 nM. It was found to counteract metabolic syndrome in mice, suggesting a possible role for compounds from this class as medications for the treatment of obesity.
