= ER =

ER or Er may refer to:

== Arts, entertainment and media ==
- ER (TV series), a 1994–2009 American medical drama series
- E/R, a 1984–1985 American TV sitcom
- Er, a character in Plato's Myth of Er
- Er, a 2005 album by Nils Petter Molvær
- ER, a 2021 album by The Kleptones
- "ER" (song), 2012, by Kanjani Eight
- "ER", a song by Royce da 5'9" featuring Kid Vishis from the 2011 album Success Is Certain
- Chico Enterprise-Record, the daily newspaper of Chico, California, US

== Businesses and organizations ==
- Astar Air Cargo, an American cargo airline, IATA designator ER
- Eastern Railway zone, in India
- Estonian Reform Party

== Language ==
- Er (Cyrillic) (Р р), a letter of the Cyrillic alphabet
- Er (cuneiform), a sign in cuneiform writing
- "er", a filler word in English
- Suffix -er in English:
  - Added to adjectives or adverbs to form a comparative (e.g., fast to faster)
  - Added to a noun to indicate resident of, as in New Yorker
  - Added to a verb to make it an agent noun (e.g., cut to cutter)
  - Oxford "-er", used to form words like rugger and footer
- R-colored vowel, usually written as "er" in English
- Erhua, adds er sound to syllables in spoken Mandarin Chinese

== People ==
- Er (biblical person), the eldest son of Judah in the book of Genesis
- Nie Er (1912–1935), Chinese composer
- Elliot Rodger (1991–2014), British-American mass murderer
- Gültigin Er (born 1997), Turkish triathlete
- ER, a royal cypher representing a monarch whose name begins with E

== Science and technology ==
=== Biology and medicine ===
- Emergency room, or emergency department, a medical facility
- Endoplasmic reticulum, a type of organelle in cell biology
- Er blood group system
- Equine exertional rhabdomyolysis, in horses
- Estrogen receptor, a type of protein molecule
- Extraction ratio, in renal physiology

=== Chemistry and physics ===
- $\varepsilon_r$, relative permittivity
- Electrorheological fluid, suspensions of non-conducting but electrically active particles
- Enantiomeric ratio, in chemistry
- Erbium, symbol Er, a chemical element
- Einstein-Rosen bridge, or ER bridge, relativistic wormholes

=== Computing ===
- .er, country code top-level domain for Eritrea
- Entity–relationship model, a conceptual representation of data
- Error Resilience, an audio coding method used in MPEG-4 Part 3

=== Engineering ===
- Engine room, a compartment of a ship where the machinery for marine propulsion is located

== Other uses ==
- Eritrea, ISO 3166-2 country code ER
- English Reports of the English Courts from 1220 to 1866

== See also ==
- ERS (disambiguation)
- Err (disambiguation)
- Ur (disambiguation)
