= Jane Irish =

American artist, painter, and ceramicist (born 1955)

- Born: 1955 (age 70–71); Pittsfield, Massachusetts
- Education: Maryland Institute College of Art Queens College
- Known for: Painting
- Movement: Political Art En plein air Decorative Arts
- Awards: Pew Fellowship in the Arts, Joan Mitchell Foundation Grant, National Endowment for the Arts Painting Fellowship, Pennsylvania Council of the Arts Painting Fellowship

Jane Irish (born 1955, Pittsfield, Massachusetts) is an American artist, painter, and ceramicist who lives and works in Philadelphia. Working primarily in gouache and egg tempera her paintings are characterized by their perspectives of Rococo interiors and explorations of the legacy of the Vietnam War. Irish infuses sumptuous interiors with memories of colonialism and orientalism, sometimes making raised text within her painting surfaces, which feature war poetry or historical protest text. The text on the surface of her ceramics includes collaborations with prominent art critics like Vincent Katz and Carter Ratcliff and poetry from Vietnam war veterans from a 1972 collection.

== Education ==
Irish attended Maryland Institute College of Art for her undergraduate studies and thenQueens College, City University of New York, for her MFA.

== Career ==
Irish currently lives and works in Philadelphia and is represented by Locks Gallery. Irish established herself as a voice in the East Village art scene of the 1980s with a series of exhibitions at Sharpe Gallery featuring architectural and interior architectural paintings. She moved to Philadelphia, eventually getting a job at the University of Pennsylvania as the Coordinator for the Master of Fine Arts Program. In 2003, Irish had a solo exhibition at the Pennsylvania Academy of the Fine Arts called "History Lesson," which included paintings and a large installation exploring the neighborhood around the museum and issues effecting the art world in regards to both socio-political and socio-economic perspectives. In 2005, Jane's work began to focus itself around the Vietnam War when she became interested in a 1970 anti-war march from Morristown, N.J., to Valley Forge. This led her to organize an exhibition called "Operation Rapid American Withdrawal, 1970/2005" with over 75 artists participating at the Crane Arts Ice Box Gallery in Philadelphia. In 2012, Jane participated in a multi-venue exhibition at La Salle University which was featured simultaneously at the La Salle University Art Museum and the Connelly Library. Irish had been using the Connelly Library’s world‐renowned rare book and manuscript collection, "Imaginative Representations of the Vietnam War", for nearly a decade leading up to that exhibition. The collection contains 20,000 creative items related to the Vietnam War, and the exhibition featured a large mural painting, other works by Irish, alongside materials from the collection chosen in collaboration with John Baky, Director of Libraries and Curator of Special Collections.

Her work is in numerous public collections including the Philadelphia Museum of Art, the Pennsylvania Academy of the Fine Arts, the Smithsonian's Hirshhorn Museum and Sculpture Garden, Bryn Mawr College, LaSalle University Museum, and the Women’s Hall of Fame in Seneca Falls, New York.

=== Select exhibitions ===
- "MICA: Then/Now" (2015), Noyes Museum of Art
- "A Gilded Age" (2014), Northern Clay Center
- "Pervasive Clay" (2014), Charles Addams Gallery at the University of Pennsylvania
- Sông Hương: Withdrawing Room (2013) Locks Gallery, Philadelphia, solo exhibition
- "War is Not What You think", (2012) La Salle University Art Museum, solo exhibition
- Jane Irish's Art of War, (2011) Locks Gallery, Philadelphia, solo exhibition with catalog with an essay by Glenn Adamson, curator at the Museum of Art and Design in New York.
- "Dirt on Delight" (2009) Institute of Contemporary Art, Philadelphia and Walker Art Center with fully illustrated publication with essays by Ingrid Schaffner, Jenelle Porter, Glenn Adamson, and Claudia Gould.
- "History Lesson" (2002), Pennsylvania Academy of the Fine Arts

== Recognition ==
In 2011 Irish received a Pew Fellowship in the Arts. In 2009, she received a prestigious Painters & Sculptors Grant from the Joan Mitchell Foundation. In 1982 she was honored with a National Endowment for the Arts Painting Fellowship.
