= TFB1M =

Protein-coding gene in the species Homo sapiens

Identifiers
- Aliases: TFB1M, CGI75, mtTFB, mtTFB1, CGI-75, transcription factor B1, mitochondrial
- External IDs: OMIM: 607033; MGI: 2146851; GeneCards: TFB1M
Available structures
PDB	Ortholog search: PDBe RCSB
PDB	List of PDB id codes 4GC5, 4GC9

Gene location (Human)
Chr.	Chromosome 6 (human)
Band	6q25.3	Start	155,256,134 bp
Band	6q25.3	End	155,314,493 bp

Gene location (Mouse)
Chr.	Chromosome 17 (mouse)
Band	17|17 A1	Start	3,569,531 bp
Band	17|17 A1	End	3,608,056 bp
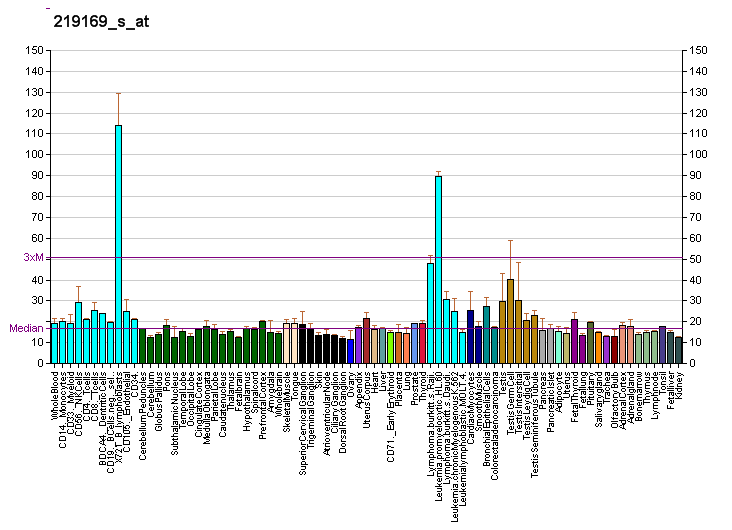
RNA expression pattern
Bgee	Human / Mouse (ortholog); Top expressed in: right adrenal gland; right adrenal cortex; left adrenal gland; left adrenal cortex; left testis; right testis; right lobe of liver; testicle; Achilles tendon; mucosa of transverse colon / Top expressed in: lumbar spinal ganglion; primary oocyte; seminiferous tubule; zygote; Paneth cell; lacrimal gland; endocardial cushion; secondary oocyte; left lobe of liver; atrioventricular junction; More reference expression data
BioGPS	More reference expression data
Gene ontology
Molecular function	methyltransferase activity; transferase activity; DNA binding; rRNA methyltransferase activity; protein binding; rRNA (adenine-N6,N6-)-dimethyltransferase activity; RNA binding
Cellular component	mitochondrial matrix; mitochondrial nucleoid; mitochondrion
Biological process	rRNA processing; methylation; mitochondrion organization; regulation of transcription, DNA-templated; rRNA methylation; transcription, DNA-templated; rRNA modification
Sources:Amigo / QuickGO
Orthologs
Databases	NCBI: entry; OMA: entry
Species	Human	Mouse
Entrez	51106	224481
Ensembl	ENSG00000029639	ENSMUSG00000036983
UniProt	Q8WVM0	Q8JZM0
RefSeq (mRNA)	NM_016020; NM_001350501; NM_001350502	NM_146074
RefSeq (protein)	NP_057104; NP_001337430; NP_001337431	NP_666186
Location (UCSC)	Chr 6: 155.26 – 155.31 Mb	Chr 17: 3.57 – 3.61 Mb
PubMed search
- Wikidata
View/Edit Human	View/Edit Mouse

Dimethyladenosine transferase 1, mitochondrial; Transcription factor B1, mitochondrial is a mitochondrial enzyme that is encoded by the TFB1M gene.

TFB1M is a mitochondrial methyltransferase, which uses S-adenosyl methionine to dimethylate two highly conserved adenosine residues at the 3'-end of the mitochondrial 12S rRNA thereby regulating the assembly or stability of the small subunit of the mitochondrial ribosome.

Additionally, TFB1M has been demonstrated to stimulate transcription from promoter templates in an in vitro system containing recombinant mitochondrial RNA polymerase and TFAM. There are no experimental data demonstrating that this function occurs in vivo; the paralogous TFB2M is more specific for this role.

== Interactions ==
TFB1M has been shown to interact with TFAM.
