= Esther Randriamamonjy =

Malagasy writer

Esther Rasoloarimalala Randriamamonjy
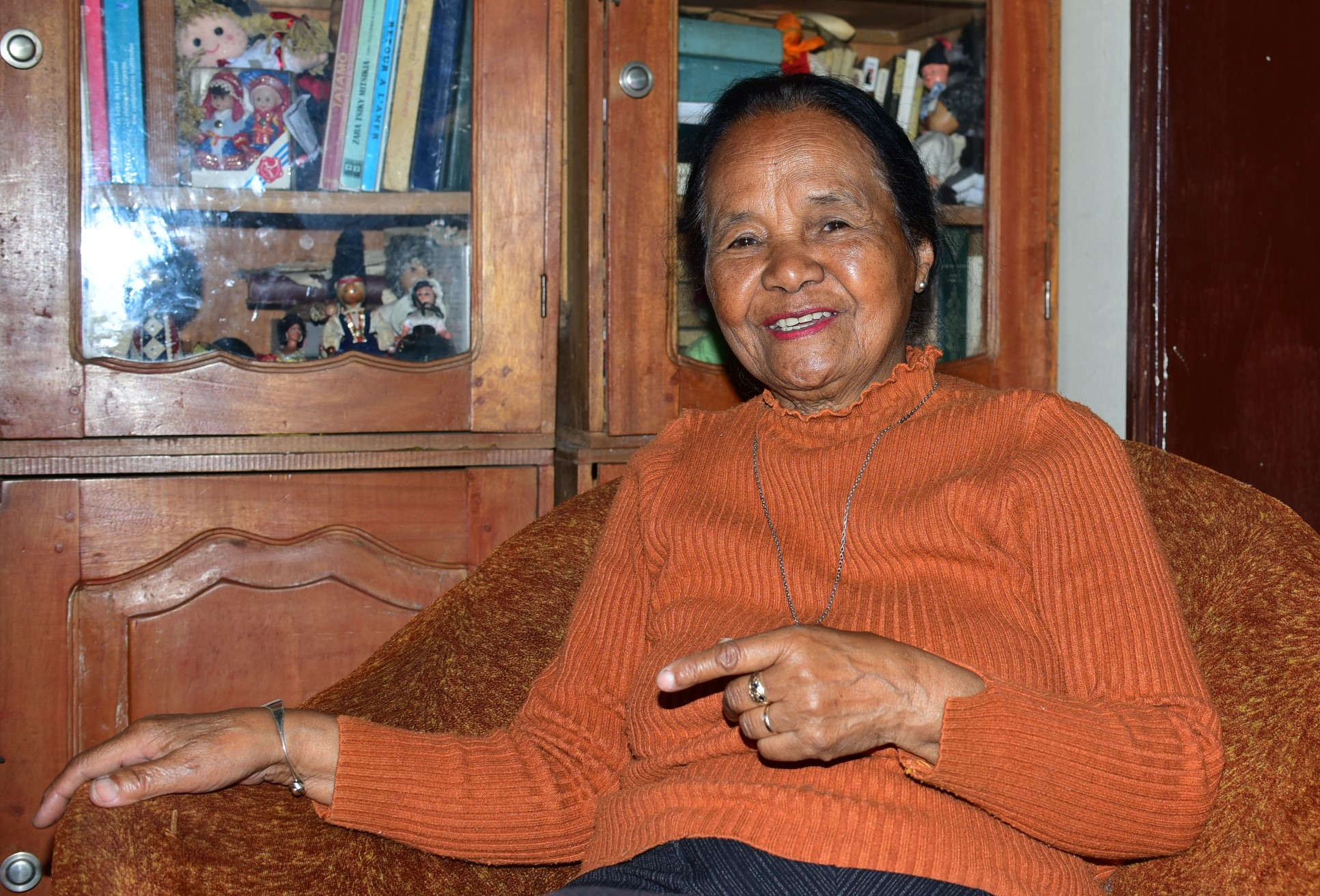
- Esther Randriamamonjy in 2024
- Born: 11 April 1933 (age 93); Ambohimahasoa, Haute Matsiatra, Madagascar
- Other names: ERR, E.R.Randriamamonjy
- Occupation: Author
- Partner: Fredéric Randriamamonjy
- Writing career
- Notable work: Malagasy literature

Esther Rasoloarimalala Randriamamonjy, also known as ERR, is a Malagasy author from Madagascar.

== Biography ==
Randriamamonjy was born in Ambohimahasoa, Haute Matsiatra, Madagascar on 11 April 1933. She attended Protestant schools in Fianarantsoa and Ambohimahasoa.

Randriamamonjy writes Malagasy literature, including folktales and children's literature. Her works are taught in secondary schools in Madagascar. From 23 February to 7 March 2024, she held an exhibition on her work at the Analakely Municipal Library to celebrate the 67th anniversary of her writing career. On 20 March, an exhibition celebrating poetry and storytelling, organized by the Culture and Artistic Life Department of the Arts, Culture, and Community Life Directorate of the Antananarivo Urban Commune was held in the Antananarivo Municipal Library where Randriamamonjy and Ny Eja were featured guests.

She has translated many foreign works into Malagasy, and many of her works have been translated into other languages. The Madagascar Tribune says that she has published a Malagasy language work in almost every literary genre.

== Bibliography ==
- Rasoloarimalala Randriamamonjy, Esther (2005). I Trimobe sy i Fara vadiny: Angano - 1: Ho an' ny zaza 4-6 taona [Trimobe and his wife Fara: Fairy Tale - 1: For children aged 4–6] (in Malagasy). Illustrations by Rainivato Rakotomalala. Trano Printy Fiangonana Loterana Malagasy.
- Rasoloarimalala Randriamamonjy, Esther (2000). Kirabókan-dry Diamondra: The Games of Diamond, Sapphire,... all Drops of Water: Angano 2 [Diamondra's Surprise Gift: The Games of Diamond, Sapphire,... all Drops of Water: Fairy Tale 2] (in Malagasy and English). Trano Printy Fiangonana Loterana Malagasy.
- Nirina Marson, Magali (2010). "Additional Contributor". Nouvelles de Madagascar [Short stories from Madagascar]. By Raharimanana, Jean-Luc; Haga, Jean-Pierre; Malala, Alexandra; Ravaloson, Johary; Rasoloarimalala Randriamamonjy, Esther (in French). Magellan & Cie. ISBN 978-2-35074-184-0.
- Rasoloarimalala Randriamamonjy, Esther (2001). Tsiky Nandrava Haizina / Sourire et Soleil Noir Ã Madagascar [A Smile That Dispelled the Darkness / Smile and Black Sun in Madagascar] (in French and Malagasy). Illustrations by Soimanga. Trano Printy Fiangonana Loterana Malagasy.
- Rasoloarimalala Randriamamonjy, Esther (2007). Izaho, Iboniamasiboniamanoro / Iboniamasiboniamanoro, Je Suis! [I am Iboniamasiboniamanoro / I am Iboniamasiboniamanoro!] (in French and Malagasy). Trano Printy Fiangonana Loterana Malagasy.
- Randriamamonjy, Fréderic; Rasoloarimalala Randriamamonjy, Esther. Anaran'ny Biby sy ny Zavamaniry Fahita Andavanandro [Names of Everyday Animals and Plants] (in Malagasy). Illustrations by Daniel Rakotomalala. Edisiona Salohy.

=== Ny Maraina (The Morning) ===
- Rasoloarimalala Randriamamonjy, Esther (c. 2006). I Kinga sy I Bota: Boky 1: Na Maraina [Kinga and Bota: Book 1: The Morning] (in Malagasy). Illustrations by Rainivato Rakotomalala. Trano Printy Fiangonana Loterana Malagasy.
- Rasoloarimalala Randriamamonjy, Esther (c. 2006). Manao Baolina I Kinga sy I Bota: Boky 2: Ny Maraina [Kinga and Bota Play Ball: Book 2: The Morning] (in Malagasy). Illustrations by Rainivato Rakotomalala. Trano Printy Fiangonana Loterana Malagasy.
- Rasoloarimalala Randriamamonjy, Esther (2008). Miresaka I Mamy sy I Kinga: Boky 3: Ny Maraina [Mamy and Kinga Talk: Book 3: The Morning] (in Malagasy). Illustrations by Rainivato Rakotomalala. Trano Printy Fiangonana Loterana Malagasy.
- Rasoloarimalala Randriamamonjy, Esther (2008). Te Hianatra I Bota sy I Kinga: Boky 4: Ny Maraina [Bota and Kinga Want to Learn: Book 4: The Morning] (in Malagasy). Illustrations by Rainivato Rakotomalala. Trano Printy Fiangonana Loterana Malagasy.
- Rasoloarimalala Randriamamonjy, Esther (2008). Te Hianatra I Bota sy I Kinga: Boky 4: Ny Maraina [Bota and Kinga Want to Learn: Book 4: The Morning] (in Malagasy). Trano Printy Fiangonana Loterana Malagasy.
- Rasoloarimalala Randriamamonjy, Esther (2008). Mihaza I Bota sy I Kinga: Boky 5: Ny Maraina [Bota and Kinga are hunting: Book 5: The Morning] (in Malagasy). Illustrations by Rainivato Rakotomalala. Trano Printy Fiangonana Loterana Malagasy.
- Rasoloarimalala Randriamamonjy, Esther (2008). Marary i Zo!: Boky 6: Ny Maraina [Zo is sick!: Book 6: The Morning] (in Malagasy). Illustrations by Rainivato Rakotomalala. Trano Printy Fiangonana Loterana Malagasy.
