= New Yorker =

New Yorker may refer to:

- A resident of New York:
  - A resident of New York City and its suburbs
    - List of people from New York City
  - A resident of the State of New York
    - Demographics of New York (state)
- The New Yorker, a magazine founded in 1925
- The New Yorkers, a 1930 musical by Cole Porter
- New Yorker (clothing), a German fashion company
- New Yorker Films
- The New Yorker (fireboat), a 1890 large fireboat operated by the FDNY
- The New Yorker (1833–1841), predecessor to the New-York Tribune
- The New Yorker (1901–1906), a weekly newspaper edited by Robert W. Criswell
- Chrysler New Yorker, an automobile
- The New Yorker Radio Hour, a radio program carried by public radio stations
- New Yorker Theatre, the former name of the Studio 54 theater in New York City
- New Yorker Hotel, in New York City
- New Yorkers (Chinese: 纽约客), a 2007 story story collection by Pai Hsien-yung

== See also ==
- New York (disambiguation)
- Knickerbocker (disambiguation)
- Yorker
- Yorkie (disambiguation)
