= Natalie Irish =

Visual artist

- Born: October 8, 1982 (age 44); New Orleans, Louisiana, U.S.
- Education: University of North Texas (attended)
- Notable work: Lip print portraits of Marilyn Monroe, Jimi Hendrix, Roy Rogers, Princess Catherine
- Spouse: Dennis Bateman

Natalie Irish (born 8 October 1982) is a Houston-based visual artist. Her mediums include metal, paint, clay, fabric, and charcoal, but she has gained attention for portraits created using lipstick. She gained media attention in 2011 for her lip print portraits of pop icons such as Marilyn Monroe, Jimi Hendrix, and Roy Rogers.

== Biography ==
Born in New Orleans, Louisiana to parents Denise and Sherman Irish, Irish has lived in Manvel, Texas since elementary school. Irish married Dennis Bateman at a drive-thru chapel in Las Vegas. They live together with four cats and a dog. Irish also has two brothers.

Irish was diagnosed with type I diabetes in 2000 during her senior year in high school. She uses an insulin pump to manage her disease. She attended the University of North Texas for their metalsmithing program, but left school after three semesters. She returned to Houston and has since become active in the Juvenile Diabetes Research Foundation and American Diabetes Association, donating both time and art to raise awareness of the disease. In lieu of wearing a medical alert bracelet, Irish had “Diabetic” tattooed on to the inside of the right wrist.

== Art ==
Irish was interested in art from a young age. The first pieces of art she recalls creating are a pitcher, two cups, and a bird - all made from clay she dug up in her backyard and dried in the sun while in elementary school. She still has the pitcher and cups in her home.

In 2011, Irish gained media attention when website Oddity Central linked to a YouTube video of her creating one of her “lip print” pieces, a technique that Irish pioneered in 2001. Irish’s lip prints are created using lipstick and kissing the canvas. A 2011 Houston Press article details her method, including a video of her creating a self-portrait.

Jermaine Rogers, a celebrated Houston-born poster artist known for his work with rock and roll bands, met Irish during a promotional tour for Vans. Irish’s first commission was a lip print of Jimi Hendrix for Rogers. Her lipstick portrait of Princess Catherine hangs in Ripley’s Believe it or Not in London.

In addition to her signature lip prints, Irish creates fashion accessories including clothing, purses and jewelry, as well as sculptures, charcoal drawings, pencil sketches and oil paintings. She has been featured in ABC News, Bored Panda, Glam.com, The Conan O’Brien Show, The Huffington Post, Time, and Yahoo News. Her art has also been featured at the Scottsdale Art Festival.
