= Erse =

Erse or Earse may refer to:

- An alternative name for any Goidelic language, especially the Irish language, from Erische
- A 16th–19th-century Scots language name for Scottish Gaelic. Also an archaic term for the Scots people, in use at least until the early 20th century.
- Aue and Erse, tributaries of the Fuhse

== See also ==
- Erase (disambiguation)
- ERS (disambiguation)
