= Exposed riverine sediments =

Sediments deposited by streams exposed when water level falls

Exposed riverine sediments, or ERS, are composed of silt, sand and gravel deposited by streams but exposed as water level falls.

Other terms for ERS include river shingle, point bars, berms and shoals and they are most common in actively meandering and braided rivers.

An exposed shoal.	An intermittent braided water course showing fluvial deposits.	A sand bar and the opposite bank.
Unspecified river, Bangladesh	Medano Creek, Great Sand Dunes National Park and Preserve, Colorado, United States	Namoi River, New South Wales, Australia

Adrian Fowles of the Countryside Council for Wales and members of the UK Environment Agency in 1993 coined ‘exposed riverine sediments’ as a term to describe the full scope of these related microhabitats. Their aim in-so-doing was to reduce confusion and pull together the conservation and scientific investigation of these habitats. Bates and Sadler (2005) have since further defined exposed riverine sediments as:

Exposed, within channel, fluvially deposited sediments (gravels, sands and silts) that lack continuous vegetation cover, whose vertical distribution lies between the levels of bankfull and the typical baseflow of the river.

Therefore, eroding river banks are ERS because they are usually composed of fluvially deposited sediment. Whereas areas of the stream bed and over-bank deposits are not ERS because they are only exposed when water levels are unusually low and are more elevated than the bankfull level respectively.

The term ERS is slowly becoming more common and has now been used in a large number of published papers, for example:

- Petts et al. 2000
- Eyre et al. 2001
- Sadler et al. 2004
- Looy et al. 2005
- Tockner et al. 2006
- Bates et al. 2006

== ERS habitat ==
A casual glance at ERS would suggest a harsh, relatively un-inhabited habitat with little value. However, ERS habitats are of considerable conservation importance because of their high species diversity, high degree of species specialisation, and large number of rare and endangered species. ERS are of substantial importance for a small number of vertebrate species, such as the rare little ringed plover, but for the most part their value lies in their invertebrate fauna.

The United Kingdom Biodiversity Action Plan, for example, lists eight species of beetle:

- Bembidion testaceum. See also Bembidion in Wikispecies.
- Lionychus quadrillum
- Perileptus areolatus. See also Perileptus in Wikispecies.
- Meotica anglica. See also Meotica in Wikispecies.
- Thinobius newberyi. See also Thinobius in Wikispecies.
- Hydrochus nitidicollis. See also Hydrochus in Wikispecies.
- Dyschirius angustatus. See also Dyschirius in Wikispecies.
- Bidessus minutisimus. See also Bidessus in Wikispecies.

and two species of stilleto fly:

- Southern silver stiletto-fly (Cliorismia rustica)
- Northern silver stiletto-fly (Spiriverpa lunulata).

that are associated with ERS.

== ERS dynamics ==
ERS rely on a continued supply of sediment from upstream, and periodic disturbances from flooding to prevent ecological succession to more vegetated riparian habitat.

=== Threats to ERS ===
Many of the threats to ERS act to:

1. reduce the supply of sediment by interrupting its downstream transfer:
  1. dam construction
  2. construction aggregate extraction
  3. reducing river erosion (river engineering and dam construction)
2. reduce the frequency and magnitude of floods (dam construction) (Plachter and Reich 1998, Sadler et al. 2005, Tockner et al. 2006).

Other threats operate over smaller scales, such as livestock trampling.
