= Error (disambiguation) =

An error (from the Latin error, meaning "wandering") is an action that is inaccurate or incorrect, a mistake.

Error or errors may also refer to:

== Music ==
- Error (band), an electro-punk-hardcore band from Los Angeles
  - Error (Error EP), released in 2004
- Errors (band), a four-piece post-electro band from Glasgow, Scotland
- "Error" (song), by Madeline Juno
- Error (VIXX EP), and the title song by the South Korean boy band
- Error (The Warning album), by the Mexican rock band
- Error (Lee Chan-hyuk album), by South Korean singer
- "Error", a song by Deftones from their 2020 album Ohms
- "Error", a live video by Susumu Hirasawa
- Error (Hong Kong group), a Hong Kong Cantopop boy music group

== Other uses ==
- Fielding error, mistake by a baseball or softball fielder
- Error (law)
- Error message, output in computers
- Error (linguistics), unintended deviation from the rules of a language variety
- Errors and residuals in statistics
- Error term

== See also ==
- Err (disambiguation)
- I am Error, a character from Zelda II: The Adventure of Link
