= Frank Irish =

English cricketer

Personal information
- Full name: Arthur Frank Irish
- Born: 23 November 1918; Dudley, Worcestershire, England
- Died: 17 July 1997 (aged 78); Sidmouth, Devon, England
- Batting: Right-handed
- Bowling: Right-arm medium
- Role: Batsman

Domestic team information
- Years: Team
- 1950: Somerset
- FC debut: 3 May 1950 Somerset v Glamorgan
- Last FC: 21 July 1950 Somerset v Warwickshire

Career statistics
Competition	First-class
Matches	16
Runs scored	629
Batting average	25.16
100s/50s	0/4
Top score	76
Balls bowled	330
Wickets	3
Bowling average	68.66
5 wickets in innings	0
10 wickets in match	0
Best bowling	2/5
Catches/stumpings	5/–
- Source: CricketArchive, 22 November 2009

Arthur Frank Irish (23 November 1918 – 17 July 1997) was a British cricketer who played first-class cricket for Somerset for one season and Minor Counties cricket for Devon for many years.

Irish was born at Dudley, Worcestershire (now West Midlands), on 23 November 1918. He was a right-handed middle-order batsman and an occasional right-arm medium pace bowler who played club cricket for Sidmouth and Minor Counties cricket for Devon from the mid-1930s. At the end of August 1939, in between Devon games, he also played for Somerset's second eleven in non-competitive matches against Glamorgan's second eleven.

After successful seasons for Devon in the immediate post-war years, Irish was recruited as a professional by Somerset for the 1950 season and immediately became a regular in the side, batting at No 3. In his first first-class match, a friendly against Glamorgan, he made 76 and 25, and the 76 was to be his highest first-class score. Just a few days later, he top-scored for his side with 67 on his County Championship debut against Sussex. And a week later in Somerset's next match he made 36 and 70 against Middlesex at Lord's.

As the season progressed, though, Irish found runs harder to come by and he passed 50 only once more in an innings, making an unbeaten 75 in the return match with Sussex at Worthing. He was injured soon after this innings and, according to Wisden Cricketers' Almanack, "after missing many matches he decided to give up full-time cricket".

Irish went back to Minor Counties' cricket with Devon for a few seasons, also playing for the Minor Counties representative side against the 1952 Indian team, a two-day match that was not first-class. He also continued to play for and captain the Sidmouth team. He ran a barber's shop and tobacconists in Sidmouth. Irish died at Sidmouth on 17 July 1997.
