= MTERF1 =

Protein-coding gene in the species Homo sapiens

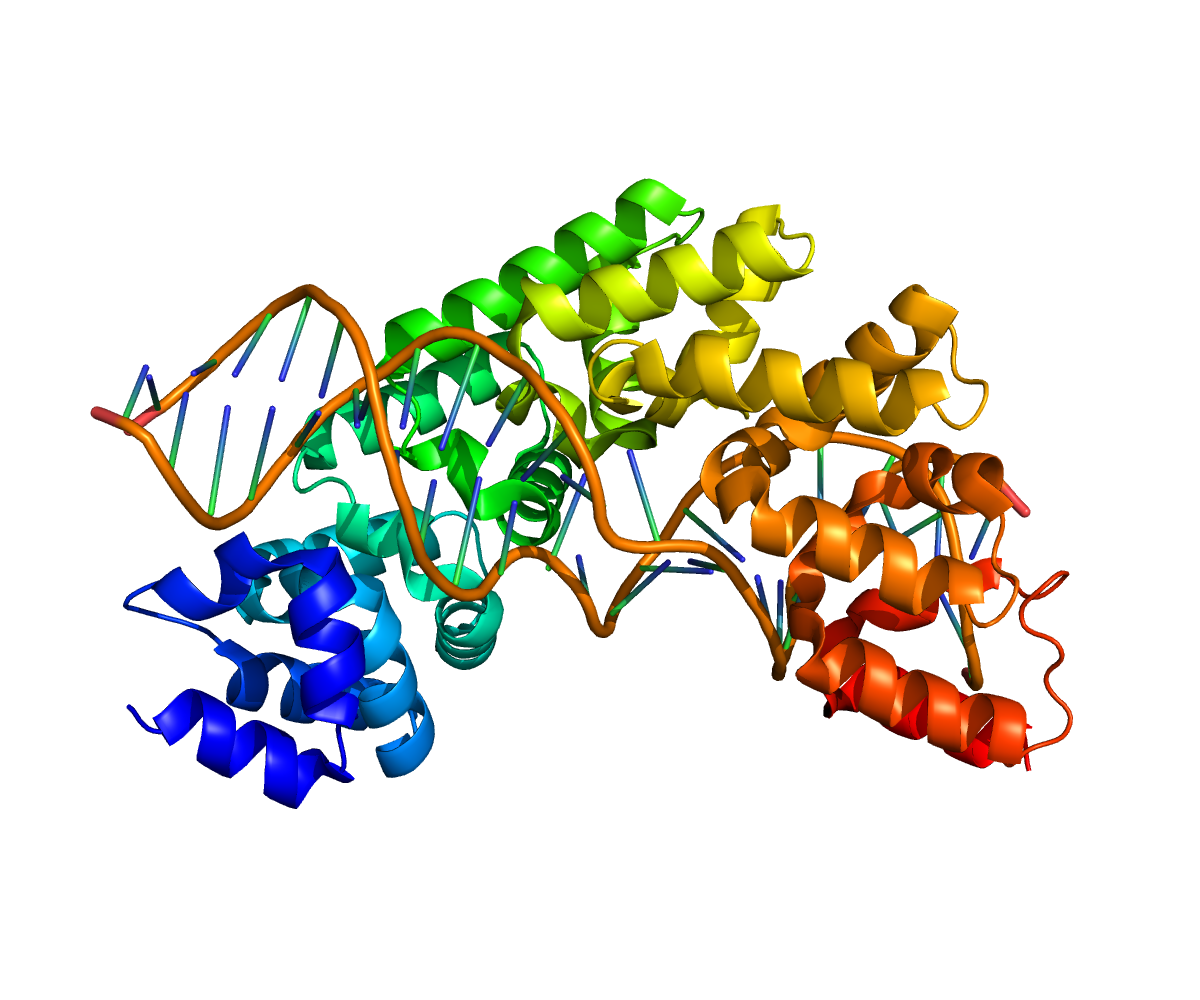

Identifiers
- Aliases: MTERF1, MTERF, mitochondrial transcription termination factor 1
- External IDs: OMIM: 602318; MGI: 3704243; GeneCards: MTERF1
Available structures
PDB	Ortholog search: PDBe RCSB
PDB	List of PDB id codes 3MVA, 3MVB, 3N6S, 3N7Q, 5CO0, 5CRJ, 5CKY, 5CRK

Gene location (Human)
Chr.	Chromosome 7 (human)
Band	7q21.2	Start	91,692,008 bp
Band	7q21.2	End	91,880,702 bp

Gene location (Mouse)
Chr.	Chromosome 5 (mouse)
Band	5 A1|5	Start	4,242,367 bp
Band	5 A1|5	End	4,247,651 bp
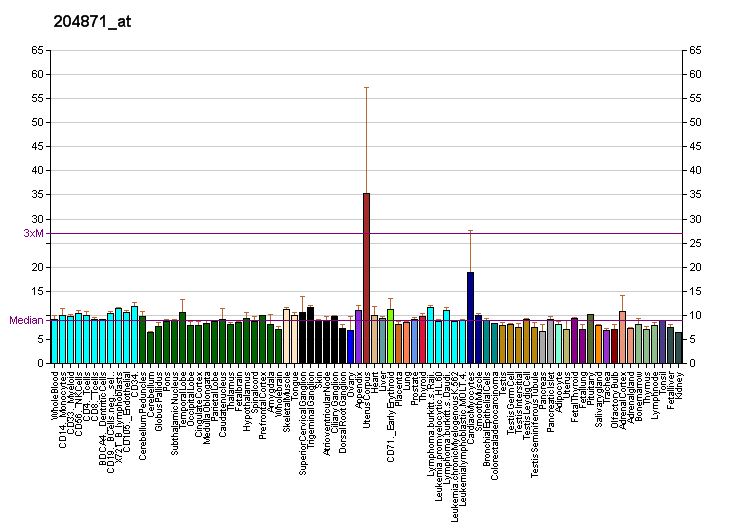
RNA expression pattern
Bgee	Human / Mouse (ortholog); Top expressed in: corpus callosum; testicle; Achilles tendon; lymph node; endometrium; islet of Langerhans; white blood cell; monocyte; gonad; ventricular zone / Top expressed in: zygote; secondary oocyte; bone marrow; granulocyte; morula; embryo; epiblast; embryo; tail of embryo; primary oocyte; More reference expression data
BioGPS	More reference expression data
Gene ontology
Molecular function	DNA binding; protein binding; double-stranded DNA binding; RNA binding
Cellular component	mitochondrial matrix; mitochondrial nucleoid; mitochondrion; cytosol
Biological process	termination of mitochondrial transcription; mitochondrion organization; regulation of transcription, DNA-templated; transcription, DNA-templated; DNA geometric change; DNA-templated transcription, termination
Sources:Amigo / QuickGO
Orthologs
Databases	NCBI: entry; OMA: entry
Species	Human	Mouse
Entrez	7978	208595
Ensembl	ENSG00000127989	ENSMUSG00000053178
UniProt	Q99551	B9EJ57
RefSeq (mRNA)	NM_001301134; NM_001301135; NM_006980	NM_001042670
RefSeq (protein)	NP_001288063; NP_001288064; NP_008911	NP_001036135
Location (UCSC)	Chr 7: 91.69 – 91.88 Mb	Chr 5: 4.24 – 4.25 Mb
PubMed search
- Wikidata
View/Edit Human	View/Edit Mouse

Mitochondrial transcription termination factor 1, also known as MTERF1, is a protein which in humans is encoded by the MTERF gene.

This gene encodes a mitochondrial transcription termination factor. This protein participates in attenuating transcription from the mitochondrial genome; this attenuation allows higher levels of expression of 16S ribosomal RNA relative to the tRNA gene downstream. The product of this gene has three leucine zipper motifs bracketed by two basic domains that are all required for DNA binding. There is evidence that, for this protein, the zippers participate in intramolecular interactions that establish the three-dimensional structure required for DNA binding.
