= Yorkie =

Yorkie may refer to:

== People ==
- Yorkie (musician) - nickname of musician David Palmer (born 1965), a member of the Liverpool-based band Space from 1997 to 2005
- Yorkie, nickname of George Shaw (footballer, born 1886), Australian rules footballer
- Yorkie, a name for someone from York or Yorkshire

== Art, entertainment, and media ==
- "Yorky" (Gunsmoke), a 1956 television episode
- Yorkie, a principal character in the Black Mirror episode, "San Junipero"
- Yorkie Mitchell, a character in The Punisher comic series
- PC Tony 'Yorkie' Smith, a character in the British TV drama series The Bill

== Other uses ==
- Yorkie (chocolate bar)
- Yorkie (Yki), a protein kinase involved in the Hippo signaling pathway, a signaling pathway in cell regulation
- Yorkie, the lion mascot for York City F.C.
- Yorkshire pudding
- Yorkshire Terrier, a dog breed
