= Jim Irish =

Irish hurler

Personal information
- Native name: Séamus Íréis (Irish)
- Born: Waterford, Ireland
- Height: 5 ft 9 in (175 cm)

Sport
- Sport: Hurling
- Position: Left wing-back
Club
- Years: Club
- 1950s-1970s: Erin's Own
Club titles
- Waterford titles: 1
Inter-county
- Years: County
- 1960s: Waterford
Inter-county titles
- Munster titles: 1
- All-Irelands: 0
- NHL: 1
- All Stars: 0

Jim Irish (born 1941 in Waterford, Ireland) is an Irish retired sportsperson. He played hurling with his local club Erin's Own and was a member of the Waterford senior inter-county team in the 1960s.
