= Electronic Reporting System =

The Electronic recording and reporting system (ERS) is used by EU countries to record, report, process, store and send fisheries data including catch, landing, sales and transhipment.

The key element is the electronic logbook where the master of a fishing vessel keeps a record of fishing operations. The record is then sent to the national authorities, which store the information in a secure database.
