= XCT-790 =

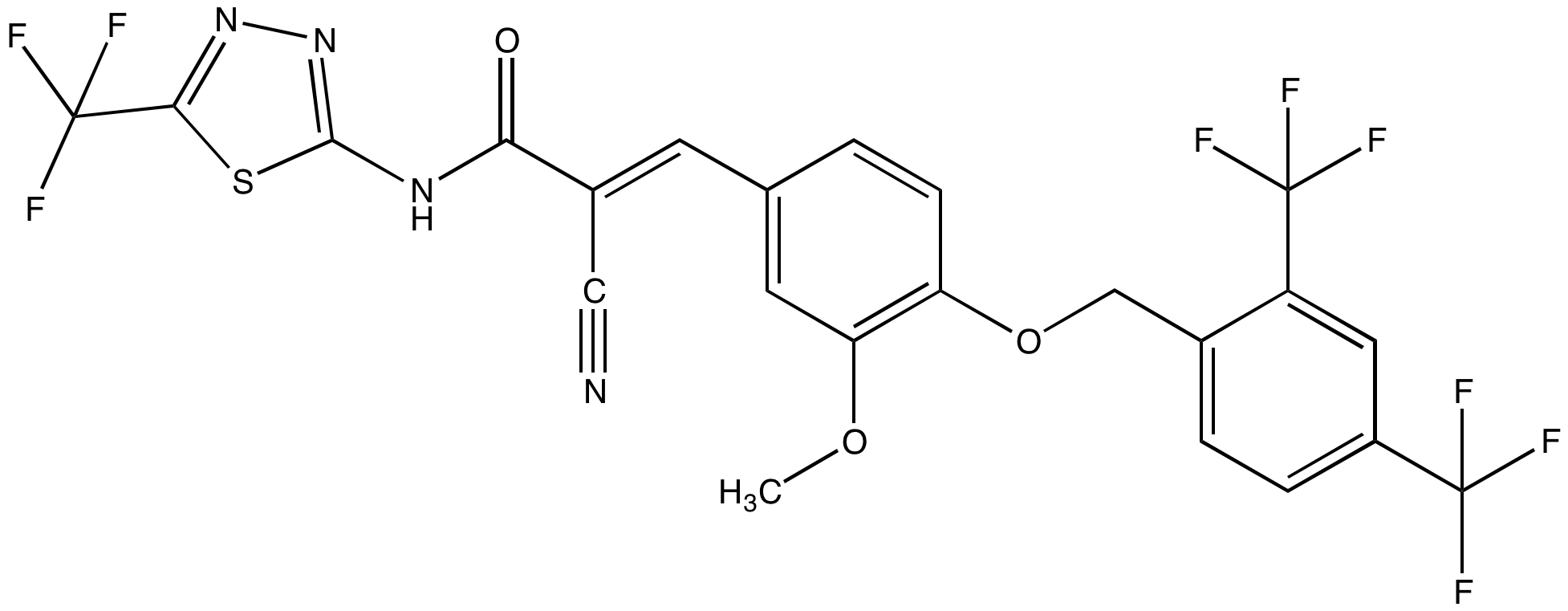

Names
- Preferred IUPAC name (2E)-3-(4-{[2,4-Bis(trifluoromethyl)phenyl]methoxy}-3-methoxyphenyl)-2-cyano-N-[5-(trifluoromethyl)-1,3,4-thiadiazol-2-yl]prop-2-enamide

Identifiers
CAS Number	796844-24-1; 725247-18-7 (non-specific)
3D model (JSmol)	Interactive image
ChEMBL	ChEMBL189753
ChemSpider	5293979
ECHA InfoCard	100.163.130
IUPHAR/BPS	2832
PubChem CID	6918788
UNII	A4CE428LGJ
CompTox Dashboard (EPA)	DTXSID40426088
- InChI: InChI=1S/C23H13F9N4O3S/c1-38-17-7-11(6-13(9-33)18(37)34-20-36-35-19(40-20)23(30,31)32)2-5-16(17)39-10-12-3-4-14(21(24,25)26)8-15(12)22(27,28)29/h2-8H,10H2,1H3,(H,34,36,37)/b13-6+ Key: HQFNFOOGGLSBBT-AWNIVKPZSA-N; InChI=1/C23H13F9N4O3S/c1-38-17-7-11(6-13(9-33)18(37)34-20-36-35-19(40-20)23(30,31)32)2-5-16(17)39-10-12-3-4-14(21(24,25)26)8-15(12)22(27,28)29/h2-8H,10H2,1H3,(H,34,36,37)/b13-6+ Key: HQFNFOOGGLSBBT-AWNIVKPZBQ
- SMILES: COC1=C(C=CC(=C1)/C=C(\C#N)/C(=O)NC2=NN=C(S2)C(F)(F)F)OCC3=C(C=C(C=C3)C(F)(F)F)C(F)(F)F

Properties
Chemical formula	C_{23}H_{13}F_{9}N_{4}O_{3}S
Molar mass	596.424949
- Except where otherwise noted, data are given for materials in their standard state (at 25 °C [77 °F], 100 kPa). verify (what is ?) Infobox references

XCT-790 is a potent and selective inverse agonist ligand of the estrogen-related receptor alpha (ERRα). Independent of its inhibition of ERRα, XCT-790 is a potent mitochondrial electron transport chain uncoupler.

== Mitochondrial electron transport chain uncoupling effect ==
XCT-790 has been shown to uncouple oxygen consumption from ATP production in mitochondria at very low, nanomolar-range doses independently of ERRα expression. Its effects are similar to proton ionophores such as FCCP, which disrupt mitochondrial transmembrane electrochemical gradients. This uncoupling leads to a fast drop in ATP production and, consequently, a prompt activation of AMPK.
