= TFB2M =

Protein-coding gene in humans

Identifiers
- Aliases: TFB2M, Hkp1, mtTFB2, transcription factor B2, mitochondrial
- External IDs: OMIM: 607055; MGI: 107937; GeneCards: TFB2M

Gene location (Human)
Chr.	Chromosome 1 (human)
Band	1q44	Start	246,540,561 bp
Band	1q44	End	246,566,261 bp

Gene location (Mouse)
Chr.	Chromosome 1 (mouse)
Band	1 H4|1 83.56 cM	Start	179,355,620 bp
Band	1 H4|1 83.56 cM	End	179,373,832 bp
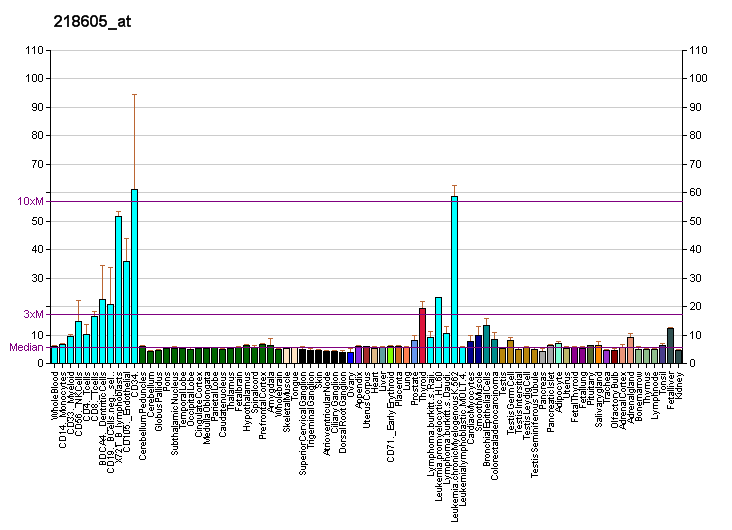
RNA expression pattern
Bgee	Human / Mouse (ortholog); Top expressed in: secondary oocyte; palpebral conjunctiva; right adrenal gland; right adrenal cortex; biceps brachii; tibia; left adrenal gland; right lobe of liver; parietal pleura; Skeletal muscle tissue of biceps brachii / Top expressed in: muscle of thigh; quadriceps femoris muscle; muscle tissue; skeletal muscle tissue; tail of embryo; zygote; renal cortex; proximal tubule; heart; epiblast; More reference expression data
BioGPS	More reference expression data
Gene ontology
Molecular function	methyltransferase activity; transferase activity; transcription coregulator activity; rRNA methyltransferase activity; rRNA (adenine-N6,N6-)-dimethyltransferase activity; RNA binding
Cellular component	cell junction; mitochondrial nucleoid; mitochondrial matrix; mitochondrion
Biological process	positive regulation of transcription, DNA-templated; rRNA processing; methylation; mitochondrion organization; regulation of transcription, DNA-templated; rRNA methylation; transcription, DNA-templated; mitochondrial transcription; transcription initiation from mitochondrial promoter; rRNA modification
Sources:Amigo / QuickGO
Orthologs
Databases	NCBI: entry; OMA: entry
Species	Human	Mouse
Entrez	64216	15278
Ensembl	ENSG00000162851	ENSMUSG00000026492
UniProt	Q9H5Q4	Q3TL26
RefSeq (mRNA)	NM_022366	NM_008249; NM_001331054; NM_001331055
RefSeq (protein)	NP_071761	NP_001317983; NP_001317984; NP_032275
Location (UCSC)	Chr 1: 246.54 – 246.57 Mb	Chr 1: 179.36 – 179.37 Mb
PubMed search
- Wikidata
View/Edit Human	View/Edit Mouse

Dimethyladenosine transferase 2; transcription factor B2, mitochondrial is an enzyme that in humans is encoded by the TFB2M gene.

This protein is a transcription initiation factor for the mitochondrial RNA polymerase, POLRMT. Its paralog TFB1M can perform a similar function, but only in vitro.
