= Irish Creek (Kansas) =

Stream in Bourbon and Linn County, Kansas, U.S.

Coordinates: 38.018366°N 95.004415°W

Irish Creek (also known as Irish Branch) is a stream in Bourbon and Linn counties, in the U.S. state of Kansas.

A large share of the first settlers being of Irish ancestry caused the name to be selected.

== See also ==
- List of rivers of Kansas
