= TFAM =

Protein-coding gene in the species Homo sapiens

Identifiers
- Aliases: TFAM, MTTF1, MTTFA, TCF6, TCF6L1, TCF6L2, TCF6L3, transcription factor A, mitochondrial, MTDPS15
- External IDs: OMIM: 600438; MGI: 107810; GeneCards: TFAM
Available structures
PDB	Ortholog search: PDBe RCSB
PDB	List of PDB id codes 3FGH, 3TMM, 3TQ6, 4NNU, 4NOD

Gene location (Human)
Chr.	Chromosome 10 (human)
Band	10q21.1	Start	58,385,345 bp
Band	10q21.1	End	58,399,220 bp

Gene location (Mouse)
Chr.	Chromosome 10 (mouse)
Band	10 B5.3|10 36.83 cM	Start	71,061,294 bp
Band	10 B5.3|10 36.83 cM	End	71,074,110 bp
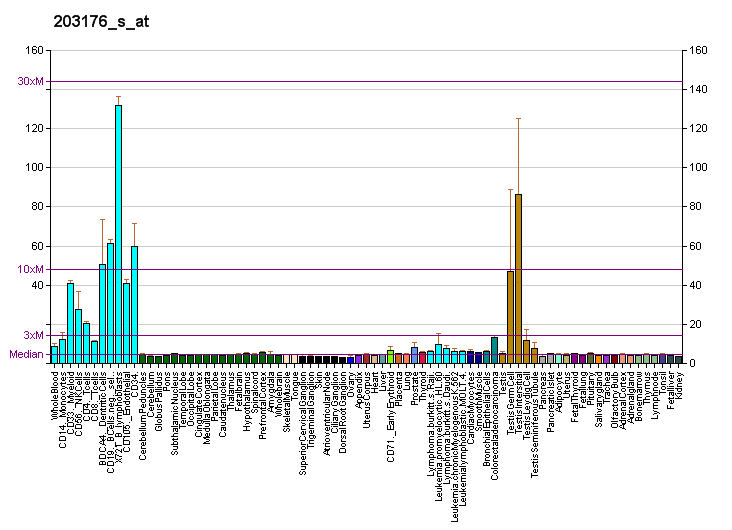

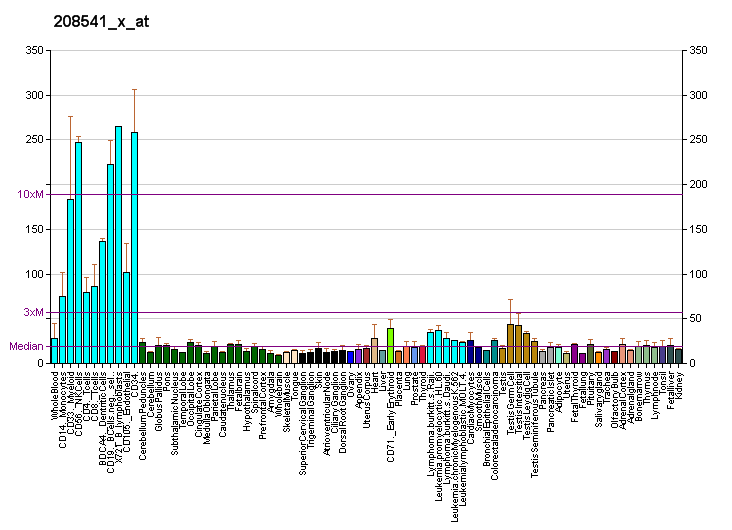

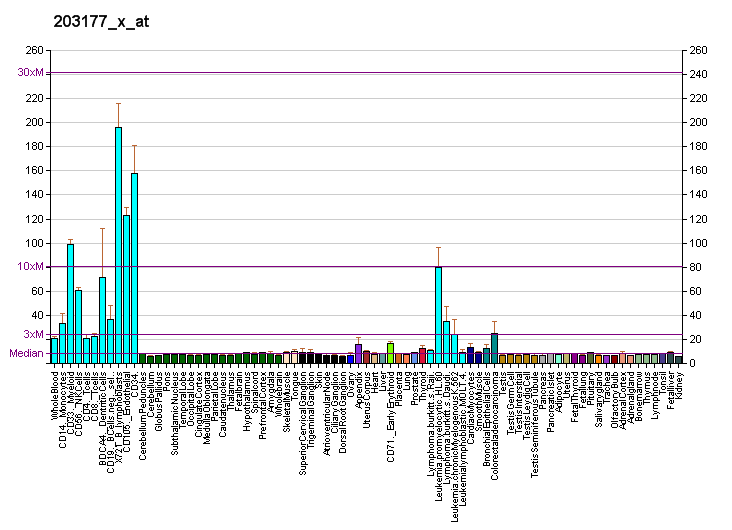
RNA expression pattern
Bgee	Human / Mouse (ortholog); Top expressed in: right testis; left testis; secondary oocyte; Achilles tendon; ventricular zone; monocyte; germinal epithelium; ganglionic eminence; mucosa of sigmoid colon; gonad / Top expressed in: ventricular zone; endocardial cushion; atrioventricular valve; abdominal wall; embryo; somite; migratory enteric neural crest cell; epiblast; muscle of thigh; triceps brachii muscle; More reference expression data
BioGPS	More reference expression data
Gene ontology
Molecular function	DNA binding; mitochondrial promoter sequence-specific DNA binding; heat shock protein binding; DNA-binding transcription factor activity; DNA-binding transcription activator activity, RNA polymerase II-specific; chromatin binding; RNA polymerase II cis-regulatory region sequence-specific DNA binding; protein binding; transcription coactivator binding; DNA binding, bending; RNA binding; sequence-specific DNA binding
Cellular component	cytosol; mitochondrial matrix; mitochondrion; mitochondrial nucleoid; nucleus; protein-containing complex
Biological process	DNA-dependent DNA replication; regulation of transcription, DNA-templated; regulation of transcription by RNA polymerase I; transcription initiation from mitochondrial promoter; mitochondrion organization; transcription, DNA-templated; positive regulation of transcription, DNA-templated; mitochondrial respiratory chain complex assembly; positive regulation of transcription by RNA polymerase II; transcription by RNA polymerase II; mitochondrial transcription
Sources:Amigo / QuickGO
Orthologs
Databases	NCBI: entry; OMA: entry
Species	Human	Mouse
Entrez	7019	21780
Ensembl	ENSG00000108064	ENSMUSG00000003923
UniProt	Q00059	P40630
RefSeq (mRNA)	NM_001270782; NM_003201; NM_012251	NM_009360
RefSeq (protein)	NP_001257711; NP_003192	NP_033386
Location (UCSC)	Chr 10: 58.39 – 58.4 Mb	Chr 10: 71.06 – 71.07 Mb
PubMed search
- Wikidata
View/Edit Human	View/Edit Mouse

Mitochondrial transcription factor A, abbreviated as TFAM or mtTFA, is a protein that in humans is encoded by the TFAM gene.

== Function ==
This gene encodes a mitochondrial transcription factor that is a key activator of mitochondrial transcription and participates in mitochondrial genome replication. TFAM binds mitochondrial promoter DNA to aid transcription of the mitochondrial genome. Studies in mice have demonstrated that this gene product is required to regulate the mitochondrial genome copy number and is essential for embryonic development. A mouse model for Kearns–Sayre syndrome was produced when expression of this gene was eliminated by targeted disruption in heart and muscle cells.

TFAM is a double box High-mobility group DNA-binding and bending protein. This bending action is important for mitochondrial transcription initiation in mammals, but not in yeasts with the homolog Abf2. TFAM may also participate in the packaging of the mitochondrial genome, as its binding activity is non-sequence-specific. In addition to its role in mitochondria, TFAM has been detected on the surface of lymphocytes. A study of the T-lymphocyte (Jurkat) and B-lymphoblast (Daudi) cell-surface proteome identified TFAM as part of a number of canonically mitochondrial proteins present at the plasma membrane surface.

== Interactions ==
TFAM has been shown to interact with TFB1M and TFB2M.
