= Estrogen-related receptor beta =

Protein-coding gene in the species Homo sapiens

ESRRB

Identifiers
- Aliases: ESRRB, DFNB35, ERR2, ERRb, ESRL2, NR3B2, estrogen related receptor beta, ERRbeta2, ERR beta-2, Esrrb
- External IDs: OMIM: 602167; MGI: 1346832; GeneCards: ESRRB
Available structures
PDB	Ortholog search: PDBe RCSB
PDB	List of PDB id codes 1LO1

Gene location (Human)
Chr.	Chromosome 14 (human)
Band	14q24.3	Start	76,310,712 bp
Band	14q24.3	End	76,501,837 bp

Gene location (Mouse)
Chr.	Chromosome 12 (mouse)
Band	12 D2|12 40.49 cM	Start	86,407,891 bp
Band	12 D2|12 40.49 cM	End	86,568,402 bp
RNA expression pattern
Bgee	Human / Mouse (ortholog); Top expressed in: testicle; human kidney; muscle of thigh; apex of heart; gastrocnemius muscle; left ventricle; renal medulla; body of stomach; right auricle of heart; skeletal muscle tissue / Top expressed in: neural layer of retina; stria vascularis; chorion; retinal pigment epithelium; vestibular sensory epithelium; morula; lumbar subsegment of spinal cord; blastocyst; secondary oocyte; ooblast; More reference expression data
BioGPS	n/a
Gene ontology
Molecular function	steroid binding; nuclear receptor activity; zinc ion binding; RNA polymerase II cis-regulatory region sequence-specific DNA binding; DNA binding; sequence-specific DNA binding; transcription factor binding; metal ion binding; steroid hormone receptor activity; transcription coactivator activity; protein binding; RNA polymerase II complex binding; cis-regulatory region sequence-specific DNA binding; DNA-binding transcription activator activity, RNA polymerase II-specific; DNA-binding transcription factor activity; transcription factor activity, RNA polymerase II distal enhancer sequence-specific binding; DNA-binding transcription factor activity, RNA polymerase II-specific; transcription factor activity, RNA polymerase II core promoter proximal region sequence-specific binding
Cellular component	nucleus; nucleoplasm; condensed chromosome; integrator complex; chromosome; cytoplasm
Biological process	regulation of transcription, DNA-templated; positive regulation of transcription by RNA polymerase II; embryonic placenta development; transcription, DNA-templated; steroid hormone mediated signaling pathway; transcription initiation from RNA polymerase II promoter; intracellular receptor signaling pathway; stem cell population maintenance; negative regulation of transcription by RNA polymerase II; cell population proliferation; stem cell division; cell dedifferentiation; photoreceptor cell maintenance; positive regulation of transcription, DNA-templated; inner ear development; positive regulation of transcription involved in G1/S transition of mitotic cell cycle; positive regulation of transcription involved in G2/M transition of mitotic cell cycle; positive regulation of stem cell population maintenance; regulation of stem cell division; negative regulation of stem cell differentiation; positive regulation of glycogen biosynthetic process; positive regulation of glycolytic process
Sources:Amigo / QuickGO
Orthologs
Databases	NCBI: entry; OMA: entry
Species	Human	Mouse
Entrez	2103	26380
Ensembl	ENSG00000119715	ENSMUSG00000021255
UniProt	O95718	Q61539
RefSeq (mRNA)	NM_004452; NM_001379180	NM_001159500; NM_011934
RefSeq (protein)	NP_004443; NP_001366109	NP_001152972; NP_036064
Location (UCSC)	Chr 14: 76.31 – 76.5 Mb	Chr 12: 86.41 – 86.57 Mb
PubMed search
- Wikidata
View/Edit Human	View/Edit Mouse

Estrogen-related receptor beta (ERR-β), also known as ESRRB or NR3B2 (nuclear receptor subfamily 3, group B, member 2), is a nuclear receptor that in humans is encoded by the ESRRB (Estrogen Related Receptor Beta) gene.

== Function ==
ESRRB has been shown to be vital for the transition between a naïve pluripotent and primed pluripotent state in mammalian cells, and NANOG controls the expression of ESRRB in this scenario.
