= Estrogen-related receptor alpha =

Protein found in humans

ESRRA

Identifiers
- Aliases: ESRRA, ERR1, ERRa, ERRalpha, ESRL1, NR3B1, estrogen related receptor alpha
- External IDs: OMIM: 601998; MGI: 1346831; GeneCards: ESRRA
Available structures
PDB	Ortholog search: PDBe RCSB
PDB	List of PDB id codes 1XB7, 2PJL, 3D24, 3K6P

Gene location (Human)
Chr.	Chromosome 11 (human)
Band	11q13.1	Start	64,305,497 bp
Band	11q13.1	End	64,316,743 bp

Gene location (Mouse)
Chr.	Chromosome 19 (mouse)
Band	19 A|19 5.08 cM	Start	6,888,345 bp
Band	19 A|19 5.08 cM	End	6,899,208 bp
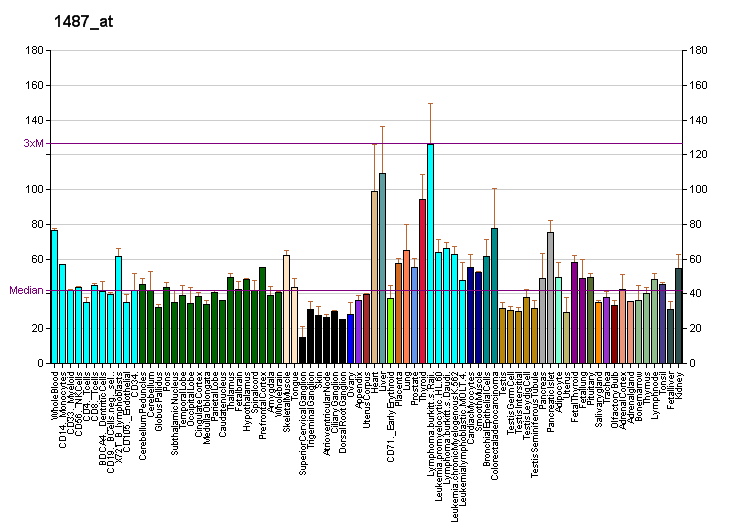

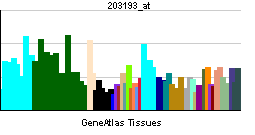
RNA expression pattern
Bgee	Human / Mouse (ortholog); Top expressed in: apex of heart; mucosa of transverse colon; gastrocnemius muscle; muscle of thigh; right auricle of heart; left ventricle; right lobe of liver; pancreatic ductal cell; body of stomach; minor salivary glands / Top expressed in: interventricular septum; choroid plexus of fourth ventricle; muscle of thigh; Rostral migratory stream; gallbladder; jejunum; duodenum; extensor digitorum longus muscle; digastric muscle; ileum; More reference expression data
BioGPS	More reference expression data
Gene ontology
Molecular function	DNA binding; sequence-specific DNA binding; protein domain specific binding; DNA-binding transcription factor activity; zinc ion binding; DNA-binding transcription activator activity, RNA polymerase II-specific; metal ion binding; RNA polymerase II cis-regulatory region sequence-specific DNA binding; steroid hormone receptor activity; DNA-binding transcription repressor activity, RNA polymerase II-specific; nuclear receptor activity; steroid binding; protein binding; DNA-binding transcription factor activity, RNA polymerase II-specific
Cellular component	microtubule cytoskeleton; nucleoplasm; intercellular bridge; nucleus; fibrillar center; cytoplasm
Biological process	response to estradiol; regulation of transcription, DNA-templated; positive regulation of cellular response to insulin stimulus; mitochondrion organization; negative regulation of transcription by RNA polymerase II; transcription, DNA-templated; positive regulation of transcription, DNA-templated; cartilage development; regulation of cell population proliferation; regulation of osteoblast differentiation; regulation of osteoclast differentiation; regulation of ossification; transcription initiation from RNA polymerase II promoter; positive regulation of transcription by RNA polymerase II; steroid hormone mediated signaling pathway; intracellular receptor signaling pathway
Sources:Amigo / QuickGO
Orthologs
Databases	NCBI: entry; OMA: entry
Species	Human	Mouse
Entrez	2101	26379
Ensembl	ENSG00000173153	ENSMUSG00000024955
UniProt	P11474	O08580
RefSeq (mRNA)	NM_001282450; NM_001282451; NM_004451	NM_007953
RefSeq (protein)	NP_001269379; NP_001269380; NP_004442	NP_031979
Location (UCSC)	Chr 11: 64.31 – 64.32 Mb	Chr 19: 6.89 – 6.9 Mb
PubMed search
- Wikidata
View/Edit Human	View/Edit Mouse

Estrogen-related receptor alpha (ERRα), also known as NR3B1 (nuclear receptor subfamily 3, group B, member 1), is a nuclear receptor that in humans is encoded by the ESRRA (Estrogen Related Receptor Alpha) gene. ERRα was originally cloned by DNA sequence homology to the estrogen receptor alpha (ERα, NR3A1), but subsequent ligand binding and reporter-gene transfection experiments demonstrated that estrogens did not regulate ERRα. Currently, ERRα is considered an orphan nuclear receptor.

== Tissue distribution ==
ERRα has wide tissue distribution but it is most highly expressed in tissues that preferentially use fatty acids as energy sources such as kidney, heart, brown adipose tissue, cerebellum, intestine, and skeletal muscle. Recently, ERRα has been detected in normal adrenal cortex tissues, in which its expression is possibly related to adrenal development, with a possible role in fetal adrenal function, in DHEAS production in adrenarche, and also in steroid production of post-adrenarche/adult life.

== Function ==
The protein encoded by this gene is a nuclear receptor that is closely related to the estrogen receptor. Results of both in vitro and in vivo studies suggest that ERRα is required for the activation of mitochondrial genes as well as increased mitochondrial biogenesis. This protein acts as a site-specific (consensus TNAAGGTCA) transcription regulator and has been also shown to interact with estrogen and the transcription factor TFIIB by direct protein-protein contact. The binding and regulatory activities of this protein have been demonstrated in the regulation of a variety of genes including lactoferrin, osteopontin, medium-chain acyl coenzyme A dehydrogenase (MCAD) and thyroid hormone receptor genes. It was reported that ERRα can activate reporters containing steroidogenesis factor 1 (SF-1) response elements as a result of transient transfection assays, and a possible role of ERRα in steroidogenesis with relation to SF-1 was subsequently demonstrated in adrenocortical cells. The transcriptional activation of CYP17A1 and SULT2A1 in the adrenal has been proposed as the mechanism of action possibly accounting for the increment in DHEAS serum levels by ERRα. ERRα has been suggested to act as a transcriptional activator of CYP11B1 and CYP11B2, which indicates that this nuclear receptor may be required for the production of cortisol and aldosterone in the adrenal gland.

=== Metabolism ===
ERRα regulates genes involved in mitochondrial biogenesis, gluconeogenesis, oxidative phosphorylation, and fatty acid metabolism, and brown adipose tissue thermogenesis. It was recently identified as an important regulator of the mammalian circadian clock, and its output pathways at both transcriptional and physiological levels regulated the expression of transcription factors involved in metabolic homeostasis. It has been demonstrated that ERRα is required for the maintenance of diurnal cholesterol, glucose, insulin, bile acid, and triglyceride levels as well as locomotor rhythms in mice. ERRα is related to mitochondrial function but studies involving ERRα knockout mice suggested that this receptor, while dispensable for basal cellular function, is definitely necessary to provide the levels of energy necessary to respond to physiological and pathological insults in diverse tissues, the lack of that nuclear receptor leading to impaired fat metabolism and absorption.

=== Estrogen signaling ===
Estrogen receptor alpha (ERα) and estrogen-related receptor alpha (ERRα) have been found to regulate many of the same genes. Furthermore, ERRα appears to modulate the activity of ERα in various tissues including breast, uterus, and bone.

== Ligands ==
No endogenous ligands of ERRα have been identified to date, hence ERRα is classified as an orphan receptor. In addition both biochemical and structural studies indicate that ERRα is constitutively active in the absence of ligand. ERRα does, however, interact with the metabolic-inducible coactivator PGC1-α in its AF2 region which is sometimes referred to as the "protein ligand" of ERRα.

The isoflavone phytoestrogens genistein and daidzein are non-selective ERR agonists, while XCT790 has been identified as a potent and selective inverse agonist of ERRα. SLU-PP-332 is a potent agonist of ERRα.

Cholesterol has recently been found to bind to and activate the ERRα, and may be the endogenous ligand for the receptor. Moreover, the effects of cholesterol, statins, and bisphosphonates on osteoclastogenesis in bone tissue require ERRα; in accordance, cholesterol-induced bone loss or bisphosphonate osteoprotection is absent in ERRα knockout mice. Furthermore, statin-associated myopathy and suppression of cholesterol-induced cytokine secretion by macrophages are reduced by absence or inhibition of ERRα. As such, modulation of ERRα signaling is a key mediator in the actions of statins (by changes in cholesterol levels) and bisphosphonates.

== See also ==
- Estrogen-related receptor
