= Estrogen-related receptor gamma =

Protein found in humans

ESRRG
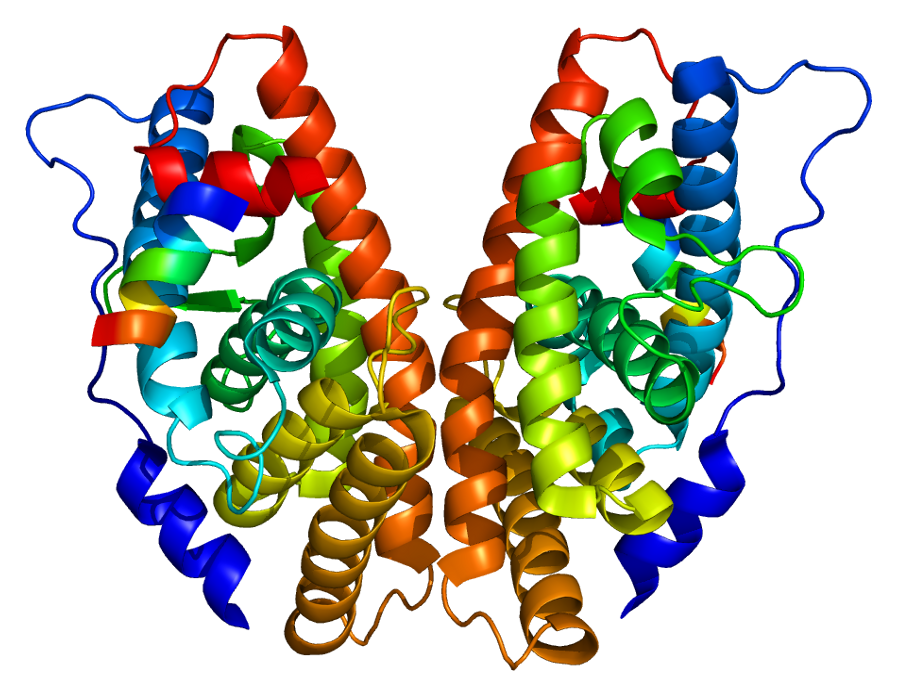

Identifiers
- Aliases: ESRRG, ERR3, ERRgamma, NR3B3, estrogen related receptor gamma, ERRg, ERR-gamma
- External IDs: OMIM: 602969; MGI: 1347056; GeneCards: ESRRG
Available structures
PDB	Ortholog search: PDBe RCSB
PDB	List of PDB id codes 1KV6, 1TFC, 1VJB, 2E2R, 2EWP, 2GP7, 2GPO, 2GPP, 2GPU, 2GPV, 2P7A, 2P7G, 2P7Z, 2ZAS, 2ZBS, 2ZKC

Gene location (Human)
Chr.	Chromosome 1 (human)
Band	1q41	Start	216,503,246 bp
Band	1q41	End	217,137,755 bp

Gene location (Mouse)
Chr.	Chromosome 1 (mouse)
Band	1|1 H5- H6	Start	187,340,988 bp
Band	1|1 H5- H6	End	187,947,082 bp
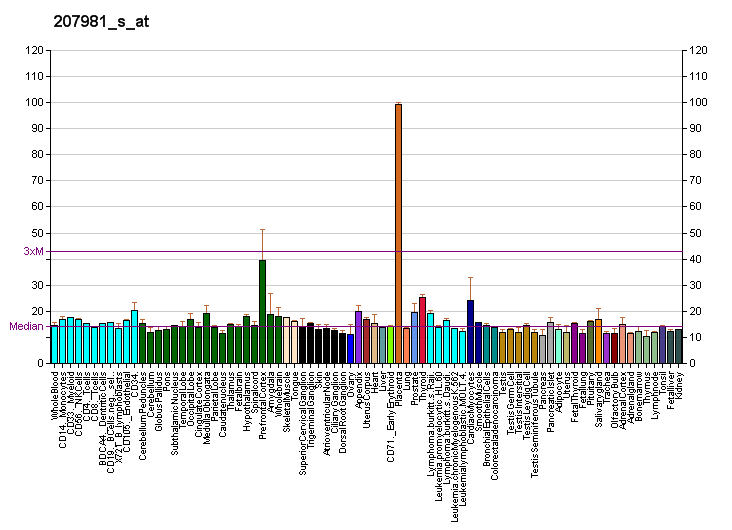

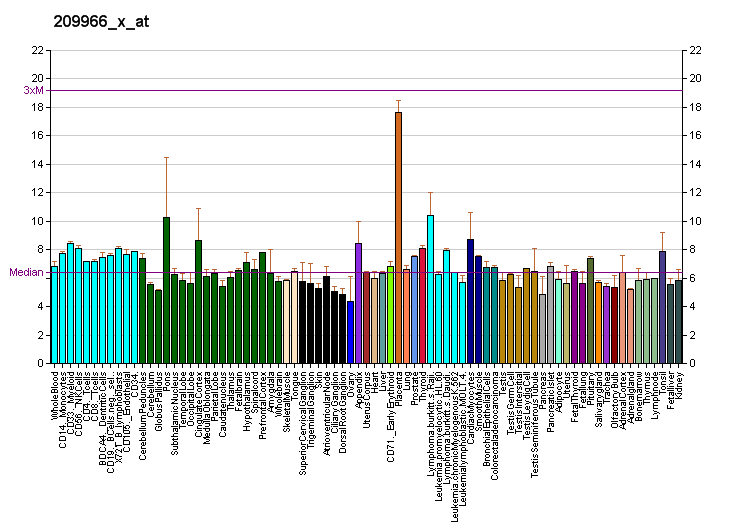
RNA expression pattern
Bgee	Human / Mouse (ortholog); Top expressed in: pons; kidney tubule; endothelial cell; renal medulla; Brodmann area 23; right ventricle; parotid gland; thoracic diaphragm; Epithelium of choroid plexus; biceps brachii / Top expressed in: pontine nuclei; deep cerebellar nuclei; medial vestibular nucleus; epithelium of stomach; lateral geniculate nucleus; submandibular gland; pineal gland; globus pallidus; dorsal tegmental nucleus; facial motor nucleus; More reference expression data
BioGPS	More reference expression data
Gene ontology
Molecular function	DNA binding; sequence-specific DNA binding; RNA polymerase II transcription regulatory region sequence-specific DNA binding; DNA-binding transcription factor activity; DNA-binding transcription activator activity, RNA polymerase II-specific; zinc ion binding; AF-2 domain binding; metal ion binding; steroid hormone receptor activity; steroid binding; protein binding; DNA-binding transcription factor activity, RNA polymerase II-specific; nuclear receptor activity
Cellular component	nucleoplasm; nucleus
Biological process	regulation of transcription, DNA-templated; transcription, DNA-templated; positive regulation of transcription, DNA-templated; retinoic acid receptor signaling pathway; transcription initiation from RNA polymerase II promoter; positive regulation of transcription by RNA polymerase II; steroid hormone mediated signaling pathway; positive regulation of cold-induced thermogenesis
Sources:Amigo / QuickGO
Orthologs
Databases	NCBI: entry; OMA: entry
Species	Human	Mouse
Entrez	2104	26381
Ensembl	ENSG00000196482	ENSMUSG00000026610
UniProt	P62508	P62509
RefSeq (mRNA)	NM_001134285; NM_001243505; NM_001243506; NM_001243507; NM_001243509 NM_001243510; NM_001243511; NM_001243512; NM_001243513; NM_001243514; NM_001243515; NM_001243518; NM_001243519; NM_001438; NM_206594; NM_206595; NM_001350122; NM_001350123; NM_001350124; NM_001350125	NM_001243792; NM_011935; NM_001357534; NM_001357535; NM_001357536
RefSeq (protein)	NP_001127757; NP_001230434; NP_001230435; NP_001230436; NP_001230438 NP_001230439; NP_001230440; NP_001230441; NP_001230442; NP_001230443; NP_001230444; NP_001230447; NP_001230448; NP_001429; NP_996317; NP_996318; NP_001337051; NP_001337052; NP_001337053; NP_001337054	NP_001230721; NP_036065; NP_001344463; NP_001344464; NP_001344465
Location (UCSC)	Chr 1: 216.5 – 217.14 Mb	Chr 1: 187.34 – 187.95 Mb
PubMed search
- Wikidata
View/Edit Human	View/Edit Mouse

Estrogen-related receptor gamma (ERR-gamma), also known as NR3B3 (nuclear receptor subfamily 3, group B, member 3), is a nuclear receptor that in humans is encoded by the ESRRG (EStrogen Related Receptor Gamma) gene. It behaves as a constitutive activator of transcription, and induces the expression of the transcription regulator PERM1 in skeletal muscles.

This protein is a member of nuclear hormone receptor family of steroid hormone receptors. No physiological activating ligand is known for this orphan receptor, but 4-hydroxytamoxifen and diethylstilbestrol act as inverse agonists and deactivate ESRRG. It also seems to be the target of bisphenol A (see below).

== Bisphenol A binding ==
There is evidence that bisphenol A functions as a xenoestrogen by binding strongly to ERR-γ. BPA as well as its nitrated and chlorinated metabolites seems to binds strongly to ERR-γ (dissociation constant = 5.5 nM), but not to the estrogen receptor (ER)., BPA binding to ERR-γ preserves its basal constitutive activity. It can also protect it from deactivation from the selective estrogen receptor modulator 4-hydroxytamoxifen.

Different expression of ERR-γ in different parts of the body may account for variations in bisphenol A effects. For instance, ERR-γ has been found in high concentration in the placenta, explaining reports of high bisphenol A accumulation there.

== Medical significance ==
Pathogenic mutations in ESRRG have been associated with movement dysfunction as part of a disorder called congenital nonprogressive movement disorder with ataxia and eye movement abnormalities (CONMAE). Those affected by this autosomal dominant disorder display atypical eye movements (especially strabismus), low muscle tone (hypotonia), and an unsteady gait (ataxia). Many also have difficulty articulating, but otherwise don't show cognitive impairment.
