= ELT =

ELT may refer to:

== Education ==
- English language teaching
- Expanded learning time, an American education strategy
- Kolb's experiential learning theory

== Mathematics and science ==
- Ending lamination theorem
- Extremely large telescope, a type of telescope
- Extremely Large Telescope, an astronomical observatory under construction in Chile
- Effective lifetime temperature, used in rehydroxylation dating

== Medicine ==
- Endovenous laser treatment
- Euglobulin lysis time
- Excimer laser trabeculostomy

== Music ==
- Every Little Thing (band), a Japanese J-Pop band
- "ELT", a song by the band Wilco from their 1999 album Summerteeth

== Technology ==
- Emergency locator transmitter
- Extract, load, transform, a data processing concept

== Transport ==
- East London Transit, a British public transport system
- El Tor Airport, in Egypt
- Elizabethtown station, Pennsylvania
- Eltham railway station, Melbourne

== Other uses ==
- Electrical lighting technician, a stage-lighting technician
- Electronic lien and title
- Elt Drenth (1949–1998), Dutch swimmer
- Evolutionary leadership theory
- Executive Leadership Team
