= Male warrior hypothesis =

Hypothesis in evolutionary psychology

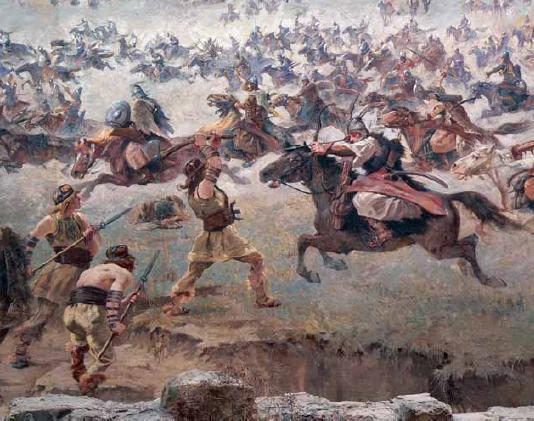
Ancient Hungarian warriors

The male warrior hypothesis (MWH) is an evolutionary psychology hypothesis by Professor Mark van Vugt which argues that human psychology has been shaped by between-group competition and conflict. Specifically, the evolutionary history of coalitional aggression between groups of men may have resulted in sex-specific differences in the way outgroups are perceived, creating ingroup vs. outgroup tendencies that are still observable today.

== Overview ==
=== Violence and warfare ===
Violence and aggression are universal across human societies, and have likely been features of human behavior since prehistory. Archaeologists have found mass graves dating to the late Pleistocene and early Holocene that contain primarily male skeletons showing signs of blunt force trauma, indicating the cause of death was by weapons used in combat.

Violence among humans occurs in distinct patterns, differing most obviously by sex. Ethnographic findings and modern crime data indicate that the majority of violence is both perpetrated by and targeted at males, and males are the most likely to be victims of violence. This male-male pattern of violence has been observed so repeatedly and in so many cultures that it may qualify as a human universal.

=== Tribal behavior ===
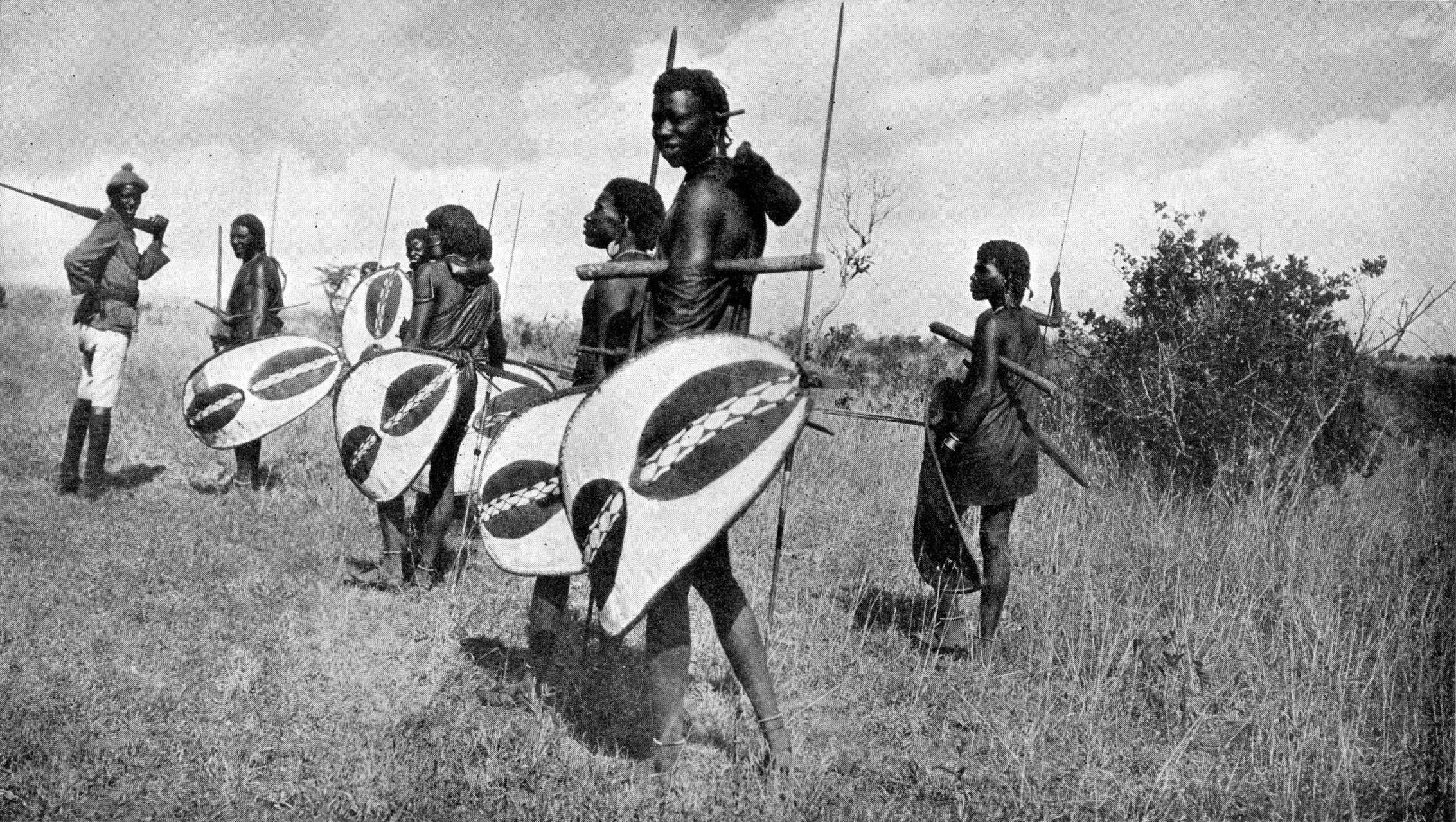
Men preparing for a raid.

Humans are a social species with a long history of living in tribal groups. The psychological mechanisms that evolved to handle the complexities of group living have also created heuristics for quickly categorizing others as ingroup or outgroup members, with different behavioral strategies for each: treat ingroup members (those in one's own group) favorably, and react to outgroup members (those who belong to a different group) with fear and aggression. These tendencies arise with little motivation, and have been provoked over superficial groups in lab studies—for example, by showing paintings to participants and creating groups based on which painting participants prefer.

The male warrior hypothesis suggests that the ease with which individuals discriminate against others is an adaptation resulting from a long history of being threatened by outgroup males, who are in competition for resources.

=== Sex differences in parental investment ===
The MWH argues that the sex differences in attitudes towards outgroup members may be a result of the different reproductive strategies used by males and females—specifically, the greater competition among males for mates. In mammals, males and females have distinct reproductive strategies based on the physiology of reproduction. Because females gestate, birth, feed, and invest more overall resources in each of their offspring, they are more selective with their mates but have greater certainty of being able to reproduce.

Males, in contrast, can mate at a very low energetic cost once they have found a partner, but are only able to attract a female if they have physical or social characteristics that can be converted into resources—e.g., territory, food resources, status, power, or influence—or the strength and alliances to coerce females to mate. As a result, there is typically much greater variability in the reproductive success of males within a species and higher competition among males for mates. The strongest, best adapted, and most powerful males may have a harem, while less fit males never reproduce.

For more details on this topic, see Trivers' theory of parental investment.

=== Male attitudes towards groups ===
The male warrior hypothesis predicts that because males may have historically remained in the groups in which they were born rather than moving away at adulthood (however in foraging societies, multilocal residence is predominant with small patrilocal bias, strict patrilocalism emerged since the rise of concept of private property), they have a higher overall relatedness to their group than the female members, who would have moved to their new husbands' group upon marriage. Males may have a stronger interest in defending their group, and will be more likely to act aggressively towards outgroup males they encounter who may be attempting to steal resources or weaken the group with violence.

For men at risk of never finding a mate, the fitness benefit to engaging in aggressive, violent behavior could outweigh the potential costs of fightings, especially if fighting alongside a coalition. Furthermore, the groups with more individuals who formed coalitions and acted altruistically to in-group members but aggressively to outgroup members would prosper (see multi-level selection).

== Observational evidence/studies ==
=== Sex differences ===
Consistent with the expectations of the male warrior hypothesis, several studies have shown more ethnocentric and xenophobic beliefs and behaviors among men (compared to women), including the more frequent use of dehumanizing speech to describe outgroup members; stronger identification with their groups; greater cooperation when faced with competition from another group; a greater desire to engage in war when presented with images of attractive (but not unattractive) members of the opposite sex; greater overall rates of male-male competition and violence (as shown in violent crime and homicide statistics); and larger body size correlating with quicker anger responses.

Studies have also tested the responses of women to outgroups, and have shown that women are most likely to fear outgroup males during the periovulatory phase of the menstrual cycle, when fertility is at its peak. Women also have more negative responses around peak fertility when the males belong to an outgroup that the woman associates with physical formidability, even if the group was constructed in the lab. Overall, women who feel most at risk of sexual coercion are more likely to fear outgroup males, which aligns with the predictions of the MWH.

=== Prepared learning studies ===
In studies of prepared learning, conditioned fear responses to images of outgroup males were far more difficult to extinguish than conditioned fear responses to outgroup females or ingroup members of either sex, as measured by conductivity tests of perspiration on the skin. These results held true whether the participant was male or female. Because the neural circuitry for fear responses are more developed towards stimuli that have posed a larger threat for most of human history (snakes and spiders, for example, which were dangers frequently encountered by foragers), these findings suggest that outgroup males may have been more of a threat to physical safety than outgroup women or ingroup members, supporting the male warrior hypothesis.

=== Sport matches ===
It is hypothesized that sport began as a way for men to develop the skills needed in primitive hunting and warfare, and later developed to act primarily as a lek where male athletes display and male spectators evaluate the qualities of potential allies and rivals. This hypothesis is supported by the observation that the most popular modern male sports require the skills needed for success in male-male physical competition and primitive hunting and warfare, and that champion male athletes obtain high status and thereby reproductive opportunities in ways that parallel those gained by successful primitive hunters and warriors. There is evidence that male and female athletes generally differ in their motivation in sports, specifically their competitiveness and risk taking, in accordance with the spectator lek hypothesis.

The male warrior hypothesis proposes that men must engage in maximally effective intra-group cooperation. Post-conflict affiliation between opponents is proposed to facilitate future cooperation. Regarding sports matches as a proxy for intra-group conflict, a study found that unrelated human males are more predisposed than females to invest in post-conflict affiliation that is expected to facilitate future intra-group cooperation.

=== Non-human evidence ===
Coalitionary violence has also been observed in social species besides humans, including other primates. Chimpanzee (Pan troglodytes) males demonstrate similar violent behavior: groups of males form coalitions that patrol the borders of their territory and attack neighboring bands. Chimpanzees also have patrilocal living patterns, which aid with forming close coalitions, as all males are likely kin.

A study of 72 species of group-living mammals found that males are more involved than females in inter-group conflict where male fitness is limited by access to mates whereas female fitness is limited by access to food and safety.

== See also ==
- Challenge hypothesis
- Gangs
- Sex differences in humans
- Sex differences in psychology
- Sexual selection in humans
- Shame-stroke
- Tribalism
- War rape
- Warrior culture
