= Mark van Vugt =

Dutch evolutionary psychologist (born 1967)

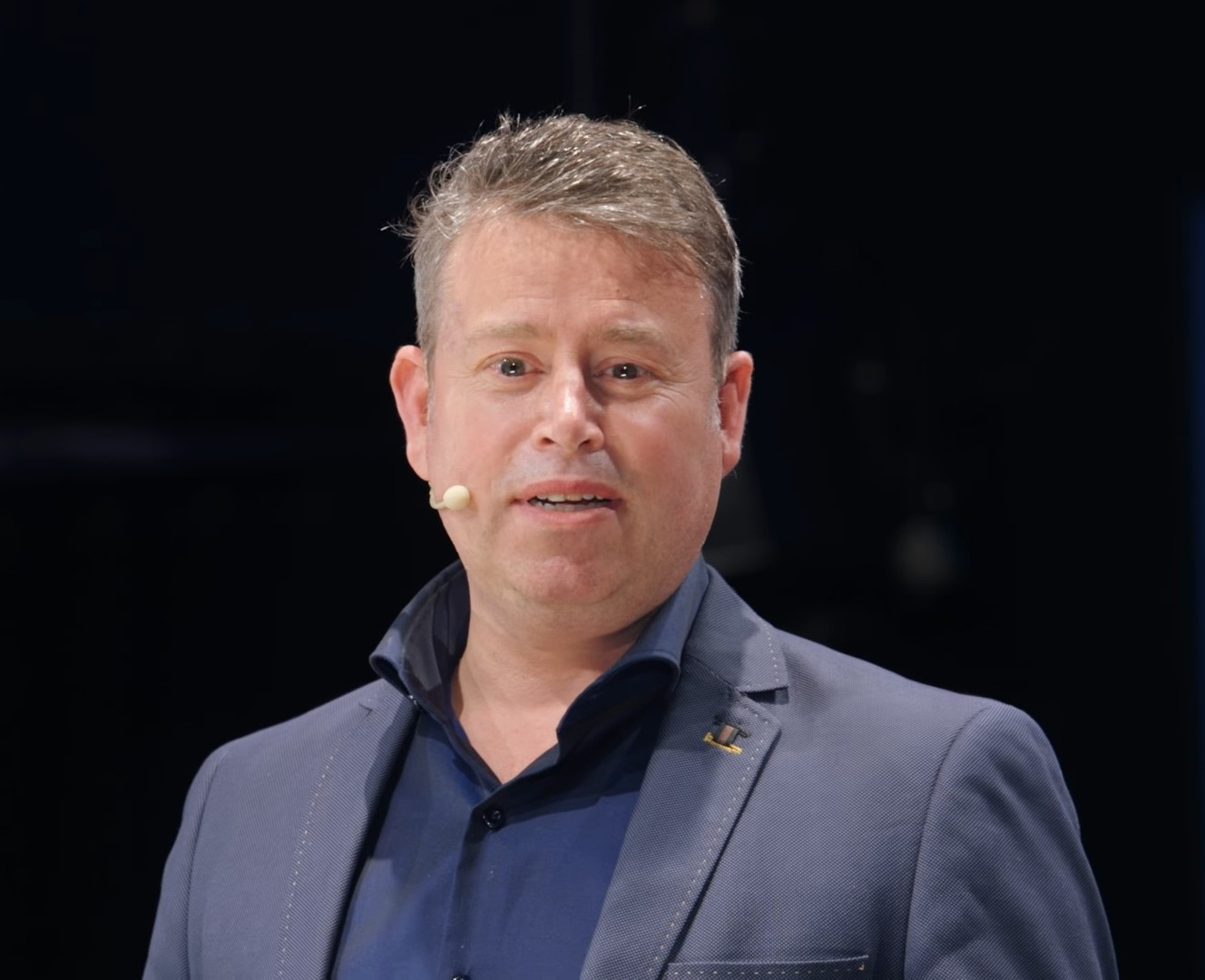
- Van Vugt in 2017
- Born: May 9, 1967 (age 59); Amsterdam, Netherlands

Academic background
- Education: University of Groningen; Maastricht University
- Thesis: Social dilemmas and transportation decisions (1996)
- Doctoral advisor: Gerjo Kok

Academic work
- Institutions: University of Southampton; University of Kent; Vrije Universiteit Amsterdam
- Doctoral students: David De Cremer
- Website: www.professormarkvanvugt.com

Mark van Vugt (2017)

Mark van Vugt on Bookbits radio

Mark van Vugt (Dutch pronunciation: [ˈmɑrk fɑɱ ˈvʏxt]; born 9 May 1967) is a Dutch evolutionary psychologist who holds a professorship in evolutionary psychology and work and organizational psychology at the Vrije Universiteit Amsterdam. Van Vugt has affiliate positions at the University of Oxford, Institute for Cognitive and Evolutionary Anthropology (ICEA).

== Career ==
Van Vugt went to Bataafs Lyceum and studied psychology at the University of Groningen, followed by a PhD in applied social psychology at Maastricht University during which he worked on research into environmental sustainability and transportation as social dilemma and tragedy of the commons problems. After receiving his PhD in 1996, Mark van Vugt was hired by the University of Southampton, UK, to work as a lecturer in psychology, followed by a professorship in 2004 at the University of Kent.

== Research ==
Van Vugt currently holds a professorship in psychology at the VU University (Vrije Universiteit) Amsterdam, bringing evolutionary and Darwinian thinking into the field of social psychology and organisational psychology. His research covers all areas of evolutionary psychology as applied to topics such as leadership followership, altruism, group dynamics, business, management, intergroup conflict and warfare, social dilemma, organisational psychology, volunteering and environmental protection.

Van Vugt has contributed to the scientific literature by proposing evolutionary evolutionary psychology theories for human social behavior. On leadership followership and organizations through the evolutionary leadership theory. On intergroup relations through the male warrior hypothesis. On the evolutionary psychology of social dilemmas. On conservation and sustainability through the lens of evolutionary psychology and evolutionary mismatch. Recently he conducted work on the Napoleon complex adopting an evolutionary lens.

== Grants and awards ==
Van Vugt is a Fellow of the British Royal Society for Arts and Commerce. He is also the first recipient of the Juda Groen award in the Netherlands for his contributions to evolution, evolutionary psychology, and human behavior. He is the Business Editor of the Evolution Institute. Van Vugt has received several grants for his research, including from national and international science foundations, and from private partners.

== Media ==
Van Vugt is the lead author of a popular science book on leadership, Naturally Selected, with British science journalist Anjana Ahuja which has been translated in over ten languages. He is also co-author of a book on evolutionary mismatch and the implications of mismatch for human society (with novelist Ronald Giphart). Van Vugt has also co-authored books on prestige social dilemmas and the evolution of cooperation and a textbook on applying social psychology. His research has been discussed in many national and international popular science media outlets as the Nature, Huffington Post New Scientist, The Times, The Guardian, CNN, BBC, ABC, Trouw and the Volkskrant.

Van Vugt has a blog on Psychology Today, He also blogs on the website of the Dutch daily newspaper de Volkskrant applying evolutionary insights to societal issues. Van Vugt further co-writes with Max Wildschut a monthly column for the Dutch business magazine Management Team applying evolutionary theory to business and management.

== Editorships ==
Van Vugt serves on the editorial board of various journals such as the Journal of Personality and Social Psychology, The Leadership Quarterly, Frontiers in Evolutionary Psychology and Human Neuroscience, and Politics and the Life Sciences. He sat on various national and international panels on psychology teaching and research quality. He is an affiliate member of the British Academy project "From Lucy to Language". He led, together with Robin Dunbar of the University of Oxford, a series of lectures for the Economic and Social Research Council highlighting the role of Darwinian and evolutionary psychology in solving societal problems such as poverty, environmental protection, charity, war and peace.

== Selected books ==
- Giphart, R., & van Vugt, M. (2018). Mismatch: How our Stone Age brain deceives us every day (and what we can do about it). Little, Brown. https://www.amazon.com/Mismatch-Stone-Brain-Deceives-Every/
- Van Lange, P., Balliet, D., Parks, C., & Van Vugt, M. (2014). Social Dilemmas. Oxford, UK: Oxford University Press.
- Buunk, A. P., & Van Vugt, M. (2013). Applying social psychology: From problems to solutions. London: Sage Publications. Second edition.
- Van Vugt, M., & Ahuja, A. (2010). Selected: Why some people lead, why others follow, and why it matters. The Evolutionary Science of Leadership. London: Profile Books/New York: Harper.
- Van Vugt, M., Snyder, M., Tyler, T., & Biel, A. (Eds.). (2000). Cooperation in modern society: Promoting the welfare of communities, states, and organizations. London: Routledge.

== Selected journal articles ==
- Spisak, B., O’Brien, M., Nicholson, N., & Van Vugt, M. (2014). Leadership in organizations: A niche-construction perspective. Academy of Management Review
- Vugt, M. van, Griskevicius, V. & Schultz, P. W. (2014). Naturally green: Harnessing Stone Age psychological biases to foster environmental behavior. Social Issue and Policy Review, 8, 1-32.
- Van Vugt, M., & Ronay, R. D. (2014).The Evolutionary Psychology of Leadership: Theory, Review, and Roadmap. Organizational Psychology Review, 4, 74–95. {{doi: 10.1177/2041386613493635}}
- Balliet, D., Li, N., Macfarlan, S., & Van Vugt, M. (2011). Sex differences in cooperation: A meta-analytic review of social dilemmas. Psychological Bulletin.
- Spisak, B., Homan, A., Grabo, A., & Van Vugt, M. (2011). Facing the situation: Testing a biosocial contingency model of leadership in intergroup relations using masculine and feminine faces. The Leadership Quarterly
- Dunbar, R, Baron, R., Frangou, A., Pearce, E., van leeuwen, E., Stow, J., Partridge, G., Macdonald, I., Barra, V., & van Vugt, M (2011). Social laughter is correlated with an elevated pain trhreshold. Proceedings of the Royal Society-B doi:10.1098/rspb.2011.1373
- Brosnan, S. F., Newton-Fisher, N. E., & Van Vugt, M. (2009). A melding of minds: When primatology meets social psychology. Personality and Social Psychology Review, 13, 129–147.
- Hardy, C. L., & Van Vugt, M. (2006). Nice guys finish first: The competitive altruism hypothesis. Personality and Social Psychology Bulletin, 32, 1402–1413.
- Van Vugt, M. (2009). Averting the Tragedy of the Commons: Using Social Psychological Science to Protect the Environment. Current Directions in Psychological Science, 18, 169–173.
- Van Vugt, M., De Cremer, D., & Janssen, D. (2007). Gender differences in competition and cooperation: The male warrior hypothesis. Psychological Science. 18, 19–23.
- Van Vugt, M., Hogan, R., & Kaiser, R. (2008). Leadership, followership, and evolution: Some lessons from the past. American Psychologist, 63, 182–196.
- Van Vugt, M. (2006). Evolutionary origins of leadership and followership. Personality and Social Psychology Review, 10, 354–372.
