= California Assembly Bill 1215 (2011) =

On September 26, 2011, California Governor Jerry Brown signed California Law AB 1215 into law. Authored by Bob Blumenfield (D-Woodland Hills), the legislation accomplished three goals: (1) increasing the fees that California car and truck dealers can charge for licensing, (2) requiring dealers to use Electronic Titling and (3) governing how automobile dealers disclose previously damaged used cars. The law went into effect on July 1, 2012.

Proponents of AB 1215 included the California New Car Dealer Association, the Independent Auto Dealers Association of California, Consumers for Auto Reliability & Safety and California Associates of Highway Patrol. California is often a leader in consumer protection legislation and consumer advocates hoped for the law to lead to a similar federal program. The bill passed the California State Assembly 67-4 and the California State Senate 30-4 before being signed by Governor Jerry Brown.

After AB 1215 went into effect, car and truck dealers in California could charge up to $80 per new or used purchase/leased vehicle transaction, up from $55 for vehicle purchase transactions and $45 for lease transactions. The fees cover titling, registration and other dealership documentation requirements. Lawmakers estimated the legislation to save taxpayers as much as $9 million per year by using electronic titling systems.

AB 1215 also included a mandate for dealers to participate in the California Department of Motor Vehicle's Business Partner Automation Program, to enable fast and easy title and registration processes, saving the state time and labor costs and dealers/consumers needless time and paper forms at the Department of Motor Vehicles.

Because of CA AB 1215, starting on July 1, 2012, California new and used car and truck dealers started to check a National Motor Vehicle Title Information System report before selling any used vehicle. The vehicle history check information contains the most up-to-date Department of Motor Vehicle title information from participating states, along with the industry’s most complete salvage auction, junkyard and insurance company sourced total loss information. Only providers cleared by the National Motor Vehicle Title Information System can participate.

Vehicle check reports showing a previous salvage or other state title brand or reported event such as insurance total loss must be disclosed to consumers. Each vehicle with salvage title brands or other problem is required to have a red 4” x 5” sticker with language warning potential buyers that the vehicle has this kind of salvage history. The dealer must also provide a copy of the car history report to the buyer. California dealers, along with national and state consumer protection groups, supported the AB 1215 bill.

== See also ==
- Vehicle history report
