= Barbara Kellerman (academic) =

American professor of public leadership

Barbara Kellerman is an American professor of public leadership, currently at Harvard University's John F. Kennedy School of Government. Previously, she was a professor at Fordham, Tufts, Fairleigh Dickinson, George Washington, and Uppsala universities and Dartmouth College. She was one of the founders of the International Leadership Association.

Kellerman ranked by Forbes.com as among "Top 50 Business Thinkers" 2009, and ranked by Leadership Excellence as in Top 15 "Best Minds on Leadership" 2008-2009.

== Biography ==
Kellerman received her B.A. from Sarah Lawrence College, and her M.A. (Russian and East European Studies), M.Phil., and Ph.D. (Political Science) degrees from Yale University. She was awarded a Danforth Fellowship and three Fulbright fellowships.

In addition to the above-named professorships, Kellerman served as Dean of Graduate Studies and Research at Fairleigh Dickinson (1987–90); held the Fulbright Chair in American Studies at Uppsala (1996–97); was Director of the Center for the Advanced Study of Leadership at the Academy of Leadership at the University of Maryland (1997–2000); served as Founding Executive Director of the Kennedy School's Center for Public Leadership (2000 to 2003); and as the Center's Research Director from 2003 to 2006. She was also cofounder of the International Leadership Association (ILA), which now has more than 2,600 members in over 70 countries worldwide.

Kellerman has received the Wilbur M. McFeely Award, National Management Association, 2010 "for outstanding contributions" to the fields of leadership and management

== Work ==
In recent years Kellerman has become as interested in followership as in leadership; as interested in bad leadership as in good leadership; and as interested in how women lead as in how men lead. Her approach to leadership and followership is interdisciplinary/multidisciplinary. And, instead of being primarily practice-based, it is in the venerable tradition of the liberal arts.

Kellerman has appeared often on media outlets such as CBS, NBC, PBS, CNN, NPR, Reuters and BBC, and she has contributed articles and reviews to the New York Times, Washington Post, Boston Globe, Los Angeles Times, and Harvard Business Review. Her blogs have appeared primarily on web sites such as Harvard Business Review and Washington Post.

In recent years she has given talks in Berlin, London, Moscow, Rome, São Paulo, Shanghai, Zurich, Jerusalem, Turin, Toronto, and Montreal. She is on the Advisory Board of the Leadership Research Network, on the Advisory Panel of the White House Leadership Project Report, on the editorial Board of Leadership Quarterly, and on the Publications Committee of the International Leadership Association.

== Selected bibliography ==
- Professionalizing Leadership, Oxford University Press, 2018 (ISBN 978-0190695781)
- The End of Leadership, HarperBusiness 2012 (ISBN 978-0062069160)
- Leadership: Essential Selections on Power, Authority, and Influence (Editor) (ISBN 1591391660)
- Followership: How Followers Are Creating Change and Changing Leaders (ISBN 1422103684)
- Women & Leadership: The State of Play and Strategies for Change (ISBN 0791440729)
- Bad Leadership: What It Is, How It Happens, Why It Matters (ISBN 1591391660)
- Reinventing Leadership: Making the Connection between Politics and Business (ISBN 0791440729)
- Cutting Edge: Leadership 2000, coeditor with Larraine Matusak and contributor (ISBN 1891464213)
- The President as World Leader, with Ryan Barilleux. (ISBN 0312052081)
- Leadership and Negotiation in the Middle East, coeditor with Jeffrey Rubin, and contributor (ISBN 0275924890)
- Political Leadership: A Source Book, editor (ISBN 082295382X)
- Women Leaders in American Politics, coeditor with James David Barber (ISBN 0139622675)
- The Political Presidency: Practice of Leadership (ISBN 0195040376)
- Leadership: Multidisciplinary Perspectives, editor and contributor (ISBN 0135276713)
- All the Presidents Kin: Their Political Roles (ISBN 0814745865)
- Making Decisions, with Percy Hill et al. (ISBN 0201031035)
