= Evolutionary leadership theory =

Analysis of leadership from an evolutionary perspective

Evolutionary leadership theory analyses the concept of leadership from an evolutionary perspective. Evolutionary psychology assumes that our thinking, feeling and doing are the product of innate psychological mechanisms. These mechanisms evolved because they enable people to effectively deal with situations that (directly or indirectly) are important for survival and reproduction (reproductive success).

Evolutionary theory suggests that both leadership and followership were important for the reproductive success of human ancestors. Evolutionary leadership theory was introduced by Professor Mark van Vugt, a professor of social and organizational psychology (VU University Amsterdam and University of Oxford) in the book Selected: Why Some People lead, Why Others Follow and Why it Matters (Van Vugt & Ahuja, 2010). The German-language books Evolutionäre Führung (2006) and Natürlich führen (2013 [2006]) by Dipl.-Psych. Michael Alznauer also approach the theme of leadership from an evolutionary viewpoint, but with a slightly different focus.

The theory distinguishes itself from other theories of leadership practice by postulating that:

- Leading and following are adaptive behavioural strategies that have evolved to solve social-coordination problems in ancestral groups (e.g. moving to new areas, big-game hunting, or conflicts with other groups).
- The relationship between leaders and followers is fundamentally ambivalent. Leaders can abuse their position of power for their own benefit at the expense of others (see also the section below on leadership and dominance).
- Modern organizational structures are sometimes inconsistent with innate psychological mechanisms of leading and following. This inconsistency provides one possible explanation for problems in the relationships between managers and subordinates in modern organizations.

== Evolution of Leadership ==
Humans evolved as social animals. The group offers protection and cooperation in hunting, gathering and sharing food to make group membership attractive to the individual. Some form of coordination may benefit group activities. Research shows that groups with leaders generally do better than groups without a leader. The core premise of evolutionary leadership theory (ELT) is that the primary function of leadership lies in facilitating group performance and effectiveness.

=== Considerations for followers ===
If leadership benefits group performance then it is in the evolutionary interests of individuals to follow. ELT uses game theory to show that it is often more attractive for individuals to follow or not follow. When deciding whether or not to follow the individual will have two considerations:

1. the added value of following a leader
2. who is the right person to follow in this particular situation

Evolutionary leadership theory assumes that these considerations (and other considerations about followership) are affected by evolved psychological mechanisms. These "instincts" determine the way we respond to leaders (even in modern times). We see that when there is no clear need for leadership, people react negatively to attempts to influence them.

=== Leader prototypes (CALP) ===
Evolutionary leadership theory suggests that in deciding whom to follow people use evolved cognitive leader prototypes. These prototypes are called "cognitive ancestral leader prototypes" CALP. The CALPs help people choose the best person to lead in a specific situation. In times of conflict, this is a physically strong and younger masculine individual not afraid to take risks. In peacetime, this is usually a more feminine person or older person with more social skills. We still see these decision rules in our modern age, as do people in times of crisis still automatically select a Big Man.

== Leadership and dominance ==
Leadership is often confused with social dominance as we see in other social species. When animals compete for limited resources (food, territory, sexual partners), the stronger animals benefit at the expense of the weak. By submitting to its stronger peer they avoid an aggressive act from the dominant animal. The dominance hierarchy reduces violence in the group. This kind of dominance hierarchy is also characteristic of other great apes such as chimpanzees and gorillas.

Dominance is difficult within species in which cooperation is important (such as humans). Weaker animals can form coalitions to attack stronger animals, something we see happening for example in chimpanzees. In human evolution, cooperation has led to a reversal of the balance of power. Someone is not a leader because he is able to dominate, but because his abilities benefit the group. Studies of hunter gatherers (people who live like our ancestors) also show that there is no formal power relations, and attempts to dominate the group are punished. The leader leads by consent of the group. The position of leader has obvious evolutionary advantages. A good leader has great respect and prestige, and this may translate into greater privileges and more sexual liaisons.

=== The problem of power ===
Power is still a relevant factor for humans, making it possible to increase own interests at the expense of others (as we see in dominance hierarchy). People therefore prefer to follow leaders who show integrity and generosity. In hunter-gatherer societies there are a number of corrective mechanisms to keep leaders in check

- gossip (damaging the reputation and thus the prestige).
- criticism (correct behaviour)
- disobedience (making him ineffective as a leader)
- departure (separating the group)
- murder (turning off the leader and thus make way for another leader)

In evolutionary leadership theory such correction mechanisms are called "strategies to overcome the powerful" (STOPs).

== The mismatch hypothesis ==
The mismatch hypothesis in ELT is a variation on the savanna principle that plays an important role in evolutionary psychology. The Savanna principle states that our brains have evolved to help humans survive in a specific environment, namely small nomadic groups on the savanna of Africa. This condition is called the environment of evolutionary adaptedness, or EEA. Because the modern conditions differ in critical respects from the EEA, some innate psychological mechanisms may not be functional any more. A good example is our preference for sweet, salty and fatty foods. Leadership in modern organizations differs in critical respects from the leadership in the EEA. Examples include:

- Physical and biological factors such as sex and stature still play an important role in the selection of leaders (managers are usually male and taller, on average, than subordinates) which may not be functional in modern organizations.
- Leaders no longer emerge from the group bottom up but they are usually assigned top down.
- Nowadays leaders have a lot more power over group members.
- Modern forms of organization limit the STOP correcting mechanisms (e.g. criticism and disobedience are often not an option).

== Relevance to modern management ==
With the rise of knowledge it appears that the traditional hierarchical relationships are increasingly undesirable and irrelevant. Turning subordinates into followers is a key success factor for organizations and employees will expect to be able to take more initiatives and show entrepreneurship. This fits well with the ideas from evolutionary leadership theory and this theory should have a role in future developments in the field of leadership. Understanding the innate evolved psychology of leadership allows us to counter the negative effects of mismatch and find a form of leadership that leads to a more desirable work culture and more effective organizations.
