= Anjana Ahuja =

British Science journalist and columnist

Anjana Ahuja ( अंजना आहूजा ) is a British science journalist and a former columnist for The Times. She is now a contributing writer at the Financial Times. She also contributes to The Daily Telegraph, Prospect, New Scientist and the Radio Times. She was named Best Science Commentator at the 2013 Comment Awards.

== Early life and education ==
Anjana Ahuja was born in London to a Punjabi Hindu family and educated at a comprehensive school in Essex. Ahuja studied physics at Imperial College London, and then took a PhD in space physics during which she worked on data about the Sun's magnetic field from the Ulysses probe.

== Career ==
After receiving her PhD in 1994, Ahuja was hired by The Times as a graduate trainee journalist. She wrote the weekly Science Notebook column in The Times, and was also a regular feature writer. Her articles have twice been nominated for the Association of British Science Writers awards, and won the 1998 EMMA award for Best Print Journalism. Her column covered all areas of science, medicine and technology, and although her articles can be defensive of properly-tested fringe science, she has often spoken out against pseudoscience and in favour of freedom of research data.

Ahuja has also served as a judge for The Aventis Prizes for Science Books and sat on committees on public awareness of science for the Royal Society and the British Council. She has served for the past decade on the editorial committee of the British Association for the Advancement of Science, recently renamed the British Science Association. She ran a series of lectures between 1998 and 2002 for the Royal Institution, highlighting the research of young scientists.

She co-wrote Selected (Profile UK; published as Naturally Selected by Harper Collins USA) with Professor Mark van Vugt, a 2010 book outlining the evolutionary origins of human leadership. In 2012, she edited Light Reading , an anthology of science writing inspired by Diamond Light Source, the UK's national synchrotron facility. In September 2012, Ahuja was awarded an Honorary Fellowship of the British Science Association, along with Professor Brian Cox, Professor Lord John Krebs and Professor Lisa Jardine. She is on Twitter as @anjahuja
