= Sex differences in psychology =

Differences in the mental functions and behaviors of the sexes

Sex differences in psychology are differences in the mental functions and behaviors of the sexes and are due to a complex interplay of biological, developmental, and cultural factors. Differences have been found in a variety of fields such as mental health, cognitive abilities, personality, emotion, sexuality, friendship, and tendency towards aggression. Such variation may be innate, learned, or both. Modern research attempts to distinguish between these causes and to analyze any ethical concerns raised. Since behavior is a result of interactions between nature and nurture, researchers are interested in investigating how biology and environment interact to produce such differences, although this is often not possible.

A number of factors combine to influence the development of sex differences, including genetics and epigenetics; differences in brain structure and function; hormones, and socialization.

The formation of gender is controversial in many scientific fields, including psychology. Specifically, researchers and theorists take different perspectives on how much of gender is due to biological, neurochemical, and evolutionary factors (nature), or is the result of culture and socialization (nurture). This is known as the nature versus nurture debate.

== Definition ==
Psychological sex differences are emotional, motivational, or cognitive discrepancies between the sexes. Differences in behavior across sexes can be biological ("sex differences"), social ("gender differences"), or a mix of the two. The close alignment and mutual confounding between sex and gender in many individuals can make it difficult to distinguish between sex and gender differences in empirical studies. Thus, while the two terms are different, with "sex" referring to biological differences and "gender" to socially constructed ones, "sex differences" and "gender differences" are sometimes used interchangeably in psychosexual analysis.

Gender is generally conceived of as a set of characteristics associated with a particular biological sex (typically male or female). These traits are sometimes referred to as being masculine or feminine. The definition of such gender categories is often culturally dependent. In some cultures, gender is not always conceived as binary, or strictly linked to biological sex. As a result, in some cultures there are third, fourth, or "some" genders.

== History ==
Beliefs about sex differences have likely existed throughout history. Since at least antiquity, thinkers like Aristotle and Galen theorized maleness and femaleness as the outcome of the heat of a person's body. The history of sex research demonstrates an ongoing coexistence of multiple, conflicting meanings of sex, rather than a linear progression of better models replacing inadequate ones.

In his 1859 book On the Origin of Species, Charles Darwin proposed that, like physical traits, psychological traits evolve through the process of sexual selection:

In the distant future I see open fields for far more important researches. Psychology will be based on a new foundation, that of the necessary acquirement of each mental power and capacity by gradation.

— Charles Darwin, The Origin of Species, 1859, p. 449.

Two of his later books, The Descent of Man, and Selection in Relation to Sex (1871) and The Expression of the Emotions in Man and Animals (1872) explore the subject of psychological differences between the sexes. The Descent of Man and Selection in Relation to Sex includes 70 pages on sexual selection in human evolution, some of which concerns psychological traits.

The study of gender took off in the 1970s. During this time period, academic works were published reflecting the changing views of researchers towards gender studies. Some of these works included textbooks, as they were an important way that information was compiled and made sense of the new field. In 1978 Women and sex roles: A social psychological perspective was published, one of the first textbooks on the psychology behind women and sex roles. Another textbook to be published, Gender and Communication, was the first textbook to discuss the topic of its subject.

Other influential academic works focused on the development of gender. In 1966, The Development of Sex Differences was published by Eleanor E Maccoby. This book went into what factors influence a child's gender development, with contributors proposing the effects of hormones, social learning, and cognitive development in respective chapters. Man and Woman, Boy and Girl, by John Money was published in 1972, reporting findings of research done with intersex subjects. The book proposed that the social environment a child grows up in is more important in determining gender than the genetic factors he or she inherits. The majority of Money's theories regarding the importance of socialization in the determination of gender have come under intense criticism, especially in connection with the inaccurate reporting of success in the infant sex reassignment of David Reimer.

In 1974, The Psychology of Sex Differences was published. It said that men and women behave more similarly than had been previously supposed. They also proposed that children have much power over what gender role they grow into, whether by choosing which parent to imitate, or doing activities such as playing with action figures or dolls. These works added new knowledge to the field of gender psychology.

== Psychological traits ==
=== Personality traits ===
Cross-cultural research has shown population-level gender differences on the tests measuring sociability and emotionality. For example, on the scales measured by the Big Five personality traits women consistently report higher neuroticism, agreeableness, warmth and openness to feelings, and men often report higher assertiveness and openness to ideas. Nevertheless, there is significant overlap in all these traits, so an individual woman may, for example, have lower neuroticism than the majority of men. The size of the differences varied between cultures. Meta-analyses have quantified these differences, finding, for instance, that the largest difference is in tender-mindedness (a facet of agreeableness), with women scoring higher. Other differences are smaller, such as in anxiety (a facet of neuroticism) and assertiveness (a facet of extroversion). The size of these differences can vary significantly between cultures; for example, the robust finding of greater neuroticism among women in the United States is not found in all cultures, such as Japan or among Black South Africans.

Across cultures, gender differences in personality traits are largest in prosperous, healthy, and egalitarian cultures in which women have more opportunities that are equal to those of men. However, variation in the magnitude of sex differences between more or less developed world regions were due to changes between men, not women, in these respective regions. That is, men in highly developed world regions were less neurotic, extroverted, conscientious and agreeable compared to men in less developed world regions. Women, on the other hand, tended not to differ significantly in personality traits across regions.

A personality trait directly linked to emotion and empathy where gender differences exist (see below) is scored on the Machiavellianism scale. Individuals who score high on this dimension are emotionally cool; this allows them to detach from others as well as values, and act egoistically rather than driven by affect, empathy or morality. In large samples of US college students, males are on average more Machiavellian than females; in particular, males are over-represented among very high Machiavellians, while females are overrepresented among low Machiavellians. A 2014 meta-analysis by researchers Rebecca Friesdorf and Paul Conway found that men score significantly higher on narcissism than women and this finding is robust across past literature. The meta-analysis included 355 studies measuring narcissism across participants from the US, Germany, China, Netherlands, Italy, UK, Hong Kong, Singapore, Switzerland, Norway, Sweden, Australia and Belgium as well as measuring latent factors from 124 additional studies.

When interests were classified by RIASEC type Holland Codes (Realistic, Investigative, Artistic, Social, Enterprising, Conventional), men were found to prefer working with things, while women preferred working with people. Men also showed stronger Realistic and Investigative interests, and women showed stronger Artistic, Social, and Conventional interests. Sex differences favoring men were also found for more specific measures of engineering, science, and mathematics interests.

A study found women tend to have higher sensitivity to others and lower autonomy or capacity to manage new situations than men.

=== Emotion ===
When measured with an affect intensity measure, women reported greater intensity of both positive and negative affect than men. Women also reported a more intense and more frequent experience of affect, joy, and love but also experienced more embarrassment, guilt, shame, sadness, anger, fear, and distress. Experiencing pride was more frequent and intense for men than for women. In imagined frightening situations, such as being home alone and witnessing a stranger walking towards your house, women reported greater fear. Women also reported more fear in situations that involved "a male's hostile and aggressive behavior". Emotional contagion refers to the phenomenon of a person's emotions becoming similar to those of surrounding people. Women have been reported to be more responsive to this. In fact, it was found in a study that men had stronger emotional experiences while women had stronger emotional expressivity, when it came to anger. It was also reported in a previous study that men had a higher physiological response to stimuli meant to induce anger. Seeing that emotional experience and expressivity are two different things, another study has found that "the emotional responses elicited by emotional videos were inconsistent between emotional experience and emotional expressivity. Men had stronger emotional experiences, whereas women had stronger emotional expressivity" where in this case emotional experience is the physiological arousal one faces due to an external stimulus and emotional expressivity is the "external expression of subjective experience."

There are documented differences in socialization that could contribute to sex differences in emotion and to differences in patterns of brain activity.

Context also determines a man or woman's emotional behavior. Context-based emotion norms, such as feeling rules or display rules, "prescribe emotional experience and expressions in specific situations like a wedding or a funeral", may be independent of the person's gender. In situations like a wedding or a funeral, the activated emotion norms apply to and constrain every person in the situation. Gender differences are more pronounced when situational demands are very small or non-existent as well as in ambiguous situations. During these situations, gender norms "are the default option that prescribes emotional behavior".

In two studies by Ann Kring, women were found to be more facially expressive than men when it came to both positive and negative emotions. These researchers concluded that women and men experience the same amount of emotion, but that women are more likely to express their emotions.

Women are known to have anatomically differently shaped tear glands than men as well as having more of the hormone prolactin, which is present in tear glands, as adults. While girls and boys cry at roughly the same amount at age 12, by age 18, women generally cry four times more than men, which could be explained by higher levels of prolactin.

=== Empathy ===
Current literature has found that women demonstrate more empathy. Women perform better than men in tests involving emotional interpretation, such as understanding facial expressions, and empathy.

Some studies argue that this is related to the subject's perceived gender identity and gendered expectations influencing the subject's implicit gender stereotypes. Additionally, culture impacts gender differences in the expression of emotions. This may be explained by the different social roles women and men have in different cultures, and by the status and power men and women hold in different societies, as well as the different cultural values various societies hold. Some studies have found no differences in empathy between women and men, and suggest that perceived gender differences are the result of motivational differences. Some researchers argue that because differences in empathy disappear on tests where it is not clear that empathy is being studied, men and women do not differ in ability, but instead in how empathetic they would like to appear to themselves and others.

Women are better at recognizing facial effects, expression processing and emotions in general, while men were better at recognizing specific behaviour which includes anger, aggression and threatening cues. Small but statistically significant sex differences favour females in "Reading of the mind" test. "Reading of the mind" test is an ability measure of theory of mind or cognitive empathy. Overall, females have an advantage in non-verbal emotional recognition.

There are sex differences in empathy from birth, which remains consistent and stable across the lifespan. Analysis of brain tools such as event related potentials has shown that females who see human suffering experience higher ERP waveforms than males. Another investigation using N400 amplitudes found higher N400 in females in response to social situations, which was positively correlated with self-reported empathy. Structural fMRI studies found females have larger grey matter volumes in posterior inferior frontal and anterior inferior parietal cortex areas which are correlated with mirror neurons in fMRI literature. Females were also found to have a stronger link between emotional and cognitive empathy.

An evolutionary explanation for the difference is that understanding and tracking relationships and reading others' emotional states was particularly important for women in prehistoric societies for tasks such as caring for children and social networking. One hypothesis suggests that women developed greater sensitivity to non-verbal communication due to their historical role as the main caretakers for young children.

=== Aggression ===
Although research on sex differences in aggression show that males are generally more likely to display aggression than females, how much of this is due to social factors and gender expectations is unclear. Aggression is closely linked with cultural definitions of "masculine" and "feminine". In some situations, women show equal or more aggression than men, although less physical; for example, women are more likely to use direct aggression in private, where other people cannot see them and are more likely to use indirect aggression in public. Men are more likely to be the targets of displays of aggression and provocation than females. Studies by Bettencourt and Miller show that when provocation is controlled for, sex differences in aggression are greatly reduced. They argue that this shows that gender-role norms play a large part in the differences in aggressive behavior between men and women.

Sex differences in aggression are one of the most robust and oldest findings in psychology. Males regardless of age engaged in more physical and verbal aggression while small effect for females engaging in more indirect aggression such as rumor spreading or gossiping. Males tend to engage in more unprovoked aggression at higher frequency than females. This greater male aggression is also present in childhood and adolescence. The difference is greater in the physical type of aggression, compared to the verbal type. Males are more likely to cyber-bully than females. Difference also showed that females reported more cyberbullying behaviour during mid-adolescence, while males showed more cyber bullying behaviour at late adolescence.

In humans, males engage in crime and especially violent crime more than females. The relationship between testosterone and aggression is highly debated in the scientific community, and evidence for a causal link between the two has resulted in conflicting conclusions. Some studies indicate that testosterone levels may be affected by environmental and social influences. while in the biological paradigm, the relationship between testosterone and the brain is primarily studied from two domains, a lumbar puncture which is mostly used to clinically diagnose disorders relevant in the nervous system and are usually not done for research purposes, a majority of research papers however rely on measures such as blood sampling (which is in widespread use across scientific academia ) in order to calculate active testosterone levels in behavior-related brain regions while the androgen is being administered or to observe testosterone increase in (mostly) men during physical activities. Involvement in crime usually rises in the early teens to mid teens, which happen at the same time as testosterone levels rise. Most studies support a link between adult criminality and testosterone, although the relationship is modest if examined separately for each sex. However, nearly all studies of juvenile delinquency and testosterone are not significant. Most studies have also found testosterone to be associated with behaviors or personality traits linked with criminality such as antisocial behavior and alcoholism.

In species that have high levels of male physical competition and aggression over females, males tend to be larger and stronger than females. Humans have modest general body sexual dimorphism on characteristics such as height and body mass. However, this may understate the sexual dimorphism regarding characteristics related to aggression since females have large fat stores. The sex differences are greater for muscle mass and especially for upper body muscle mass. Men's skeleton, especially in the vulnerable face, is more robust. Another possible explanation, instead of intra-species aggression, for this sexual dimorphism may be that it is an adaption for a sexual division of labor with males doing the hunting. However, the hunting theory may have difficulty explaining differences regarding features such as stronger protective skeleton, beards (not helpful in hunting, but they increase the perceived size of the jaws and perceived dominance, which may be helpful in intra-species male competition), and greater male ability at interception (greater targeting ability can be explained by hunting).

=== Ethics and morality ===
One study found that women are more likely to hold a care-based moral framework while men tend towards a more justice-based morality. This is usually based on the fact that men have slightly more utilitarian reasoning while women have more deontological reasoning which is largely because of greater female affective response and rejection of harm-based behaviours (based on dual process theory). Women tend to have greater moral sensitivity than men. Using the five moral principles of care, fairness, loyalty, authority, and purity (based on moral foundations theory), women consistently score higher on care, fairness, and purity across 67 cultures. On the other hand, sex differences in loyalty and authority were small in size and highly variable across cultural contexts. Country-level sex differences in all moral foundations in relation to cultural, socioeconomic, and gender-related indicators reveal that global sex differences in moral foundations are larger in individualistic, Western, and gender-equal cultures.

== Cognitive traits ==
Sex-related differences of cognitive functioning is questioned in research done on the areas of perception, attention, reasoning, thinking, problem solving, memory, learning, language and emotion. Cognitive testing on the sexes involves written tests that typically have a time limit, the most common form being a standardized test such as the SAT or ACT. These test basic individual abilities rather than complex combination of abilities needed to solve real life problems. Analysis of the research has found a lack of credibility when relying on published studies about cognition because most contain findings of cognitive differences between the males and females, but they overlook those that do not show any differences, creating a pool of biased information. Those differences found are attributed to both social and biological factors.

It was once thought that sex differences in cognitive task and problem solving did not occur until puberty. However, as of 2000, evidence suggested that cognitive and skill differences are present earlier in development. For example, researchers have found that three- and four-year-old boys were better at targeting and at mentally rotating figures within a clock face than girls of the same age. Prepubescent girls, however, excelled at recalling lists of words. These sex differences in cognition correspond to patterns of ability rather than overall intelligence. Laboratory settings are used to systematically study the sexual dimorphism in problem solving task performed by adults.

On average, females excel relative to males on tests that measure recollection. They have an advantage on processing speed involving letters, digits and rapid naming tasks. Females tend to have better object location memory and verbal memory. They also perform better at verbal learning. Females have better performance at matching items and precision tasks, such as placing pegs into designated holes. In maze and path completion tasks, males learn the goal route in fewer trials than females, but females remember more of the landmarks presented. This suggests that females use landmarks in everyday situations to orient themselves more than males. Females were better at remembering whether objects had switched places or not.

On average, males excel relative to females at certain spatial tasks. Specifically, males have an advantage in tests that require the mental rotation or manipulation of an object. In a computer simulation of a maze task, males completed the task faster and with fewer errors than their female counterparts. Additionally, males have displayed higher accuracy in tests of targeted motor skills, such as guiding projectiles. Males are also faster on reaction time and finger tapping tests.

Doreen Kimura, a psychobiologist, has published books and articles specifically on the subject of sex and cognition. Since studying gender differences in cognition, Kimura has further proved generalizations made from research data collected in the field of cognitive psychology. These scientific findings have not been generalized cross culturally. Females have shown to have a higher ability in reading facial and body cues than their male counterparts. Though studies have found females to have more advanced verbal skills, men and women in adulthood do not have varied vocabularies. Women tend to have better spelling capabilities and verbal memory.

=== Intelligence ===
An article published in the Review of Educational Research summarizes the history of the controversy around sex differences in variability of intelligence. Through modern research, the main idea has held that males have a much wider range in test performance in IQ tests. The study also analyzes data concerning differences in central tendencies through environmental and biological theories. Males were found to have much wider variation than females in areas of quantitative reasoning, spatial visualization, spelling, and general knowledge than females. In the studies conclusion, to form an accurate summary, both the variability in sex differences and in the central tendencies must be examined to generalize the cognitive variances of males and females.

Empirical studies of g, or general intelligence, in men and women have given inconsistent results, showing either no differences or advantages for either sex. The differences in average IQ between women and men are small in magnitude and inconsistent in direction.

There have been many studies where this issue has been looked into. Scientists have found that a mindset of differing intelligence is still prominent in many cultures. Databases like ProQuest Central, PsycINFO, and Web of Science were searched for more information on this topic. This resulted in a total of 71 studies that show a variety of gender inequalities across the world.

According to the 1995 report Intelligence: Knowns and Unknowns by the American Psychological Association, "Most standard tests of intelligence have been constructed so that there are no overall score differences between females and males." Arthur Jensen in 1998 conducted studies on sex differences in intelligence through tests that were "loaded heavily on g" but were not normalized to eliminate sex differences. He concluded, "No evidence was found for sex differences in the mean level of g. Males, on average, excel on some factors; females on others". Jensen's results that no overall sex differences existed for g has been strengthened by researchers who assessed this issue with a battery of 42 mental ability tests and found no overall sex difference.

Although most of the tests showed no difference, there were some that did. For example, some tests found females performed better on verbal abilities while males performed better on visuospatial abilities. Females have been found to perform better on tests of vocabulary, reading comprehension, speech production and essay writing. Males have been found to perform better on spatial visualization, spatial perception, and mental rotation tasks. Researchers have recommended that general models such as fluid and crystallized intelligence be divided into verbal, perceptual and visuospatial domains of g, because when this model is applied then females perform better on verbal and perceptual tasks while males outperform them on visuospatial tasks.

There are, however, also differences in the capacity of males and females in performing certain tasks, such as rotation of objects in space, often categorized as spatial ability. These differences are more pronounced when people are exposed to a stereotype threat to their gender, which can be as subtle as being asked for their gender before being tested. Differences in mental rotation have also been seen to correlate with computer experience and video game practice, with as little as 10 hours of video game training reducing the disparity. Other traditionally male advantages, such as in the field of mathematics are less clear; again, differences may be caused by stereotype threats to women, and several recent studies show no difference whatsoever. Meta-analyses based on contemporary data indicate that, in general, females have reached parity with males in math performance. One synthesis of data from state assessments of over 7 million US students in grades 2 through 11 found no gender difference at any grade level. For tests that include complex problem solving, the gender difference is also small. In some regions, especially in Arab countries, observed sex differences in math ability favor girls and women, and in gender-equal countries the traditional difference is eliminated, highlighting the importance of societal influences. Although females have lesser performance in spatial abilities on average, they have better performance in processing speed involving letters, digits and rapid naming tasks, object location memory, verbal memory, and also verbal learning.

In 2021, Lise Eliot et al found no difference in overall male/female abilities in verbal, spatial or emotion processing.

=== Memory ===
The results from research on sex differences in memory are mixed and inconsistent, as some studies show no difference, and others show a female or male advantage. Women tend to perform better in episodic memory tasks and access their memories faster than men and use more emotional terms when describing memories. Women also outperform men in random word recall, semantic memory and autobiographical memory. Men are more likely to get the gist of events rather than be aware of specific details. Men also recall more factual information like childhood memories better than women, and also have increased spatial based memories. Men use strategies where they use mental spatial maps and are better at knowing absolute direction, like north and south. Women use landmarks and directional cues for spatial navigation. Also, estradiol, a hormone found in women, affects learning and memory. Estradiol affects the function related to memory in the brain because it maintains cognitive function by increasing nervous tissue growth in the brain to help maintain memory. Though women experience brain fog when they go through menopause, it has been attributed to stress and processes in frontal neural networks instead.

=== Cognitive control of behavior ===
A 2011 meta-analyses found that women have small, but persistent, advantages in punishment sensitivity and effortful control across cultures. A 2014 review found that in humans, women discount more steeply than men, but sex differences on measures of impulsive action depend on tasks and subject samples.

== Behavior ==
=== Childhood play ===
The differences between males and females in the context of childhood play is linked to differences in gender roles. A research on the "acquisition of fundamental movement skills" found that even though the level of mastery for certain skills were about the same for both boys and girls, after a certain age boys have better object control skills than girls do.

Some differences in gender roles influence on childhood play are suggested to be biological. A study by Alexander, Wilcox, and Woods led to the conclusion that toy preferences are innate. The reason being that the infants in the study visually discriminated between dolls and trucks. Where as the girls preferred the dolls over the truck, the boys preferred the trucks.

Hines and Kaufman hypothesized that girls with Congenital Adrenal Hyperplasia who are exposed to high androgen levels during pregnancy might be more physically forceful and rougher like boys are observed to be when they play. The results of Hines and Kaufman's research led them to conclude that androgen didn't cause girls with Congenital Adrenal Hyperplasia to be rougher than unaffected girls during play. The study suggested socialization also influenced the type of play children participated in.

=== Sexual behavior ===
Several psychological theories consider the development and expression of gender differences in human sexuality. Many of these theories predict that men should be more approving of casual sex (sex happening outside a stable, committed relationship such as marriage) and more promiscuous (have a higher number of sexual partners) than women.

A sociobiological approach applies evolutionary biology to human sexuality, emphasizing the role of the quest for reproductive success in shaping patterns of sexual behavior. Women produce fewer eggs than men do sperm and must devote considerable energy to gestating their offspring. Thus, according to sociobiologists, women are more invested in reproduction and childrearing than men and are, therefore, more selective in their choice of mates. Sociobiologists argue that the contrary evolutionary pressure encourages males to be more promiscuous. Over time, sociobiologists claim, promiscuous males and invested females will have more surviving offspring, perpetuating these genetic traits in their descendants. It may not be possible to accurately test sociobiological theories in relation to promiscuity and casual sex in contemporary (U.S.) society, which is quite different from the ancestral human societies in which most natural selection for sexual traits has occurred.

In her 2010 paper, The Hero's Relationship to Family: A Preliminary Sociobiological Analysis of Sex Differences in Hero Characteristics Using Children's Fantasy Literature, Dr. Victoria Ingalls, a Biology Professor at Marist College, examines the role of an author's sex on the traits that they ascribe to their main characters. She finds that, regardless of the sex of the character, heroes created by female authors tend to have more robust families and frequently embark on the central quests in the novel in order to defend such family members. In contrast, in stories written by male authors, the hero's family is often portrayed negatively and used to create the conditions necessary for a main character driven by rebellion, anger, and revenge. Ingalls argues that these differences are the result of sociobiology. Natural selection, acting over many generations, she suggests, has selected for dominant males. These males are most reproductively prolific when they can become the alpha member of the group. Thus, male authors subconsciously believe that, to create a strong hero, they must eliminate or downgrade the power of their protagonists' families, rendering the hero the family's alpha member. Conversely, Ingalls posits that females have been shaped by evolution to be heavily invested in their families. Females must gestate their offspring, reducing the number of children that they can produce over a lifetime relative to males. Thus, each individual child constitutes a larger percentage of the female parents' descendants than the male parents' descendants. Therefore, females are more invested in the rearing of each child. Ingalls argues that this investment in family leads female authors to subconsciously create protagonists whose main narrative drivers are related to the protection of family members. Thus, according to Ingalls, the impacts of sociobiology are as far-reaching as to affect human narratives.

Neoanalytic theories are based on the observation that mothers, as opposed to fathers, bear the major responsibility for childcare in most families and cultures; both male and female infants, therefore, form an intense emotional attachment to their mother, a woman. According to feminist psychoanalytic theorist Nancy Chodorow, girls tend to preserve this attachment throughout life and define their identities in relational terms, whereas boys must reject this maternal attachment in order to develop a masculine identity. In addition, this theory predicts that women's economic dependence on men in a male-dominated society will tend to cause women to approve of sex more in committed relationships providing economic security, and less so in casual relationships. This concept was explored by Chinese feminist He-Yin Zhen who writes that financial sustenance is central to women's desire for marriage. Without this need for economic support, she argues, commitment is not necessary. Thus, in a society where financial stability is male-derived, women are more likely to approve of sex in relationships that guarantee it.

The sexual strategies theory by David Buss and David P. Schmitt is an evolutionary psychology theory regarding female and male short-term and long-term mating strategies which they argued are dependent on several different goals and vary depending on the environment.

According to social learning theory, sexuality is influenced by people's social environment. This theory suggests that sexual attitudes and behaviors are learned through observation of role models such as parents and media figures, as well as through positive or negative reinforcements for behaviors that match or defy established gender roles. It predicts that gender differences in sexuality can change over time as a function of changing social norms, and also that a societal double standard in punishing women more severely than men (who may in fact be rewarded) for engaging in promiscuous or casual sex will lead to significant gender differences in attitudes and behaviors regarding sexuality.

Such a societal double standard also figures in social role theory, which suggests that sexual attitudes and behaviors are shaped by the roles that men and women are expected to fill in society, and script theory, which focuses on the symbolic meaning of behaviors; this theory suggests that social conventions influence the meaning of specific acts, such as male sexuality being tied more to individual pleasure and macho stereotypes (therefore predicting a high number of casual sexual encounters) and female sexuality being tied more to the quality of a committed relationship.

The ovulatory shift hypothesis is the contested theory that female behaviour and preferences relating to mate selection changes throughout the ovulation cycle. A meta-analysis of 58 studies concluded that there was no evidence to support this theory. Another meta-analysis found that the hypothesis was only support in regards to short-term attraction. Additionally, a 2016 paper suggested that any possible changes in preferences during ovulation would be moderated by the relationship quality itself, even to the point of inversion in favor of the female's current partner.

A recent study sought to test the connection between current fertility status and sociosexual attitudes and desires; the researchers concluded that their hypothesis was not met, meaning they found no connection between women's fertility status and sociosexual desires or attitudes.

Sexual regret is also different for both sexes, as women tend to regret a past short term sexual relationship significantly more than sexual inaction, whilst men regret sexual inaction fractionally more than sexual action. Women regret actions such as losing their virginity to the "wrong" partner, unsafe sex and sex with a stranger significantly more than men, who conversely regret not being more sexually adventurous while young and single and being too shy to indicate sexual attraction more, indicating evidence for evolved sex differences.

== Mental health ==
Childhood conduct disorder and adult antisocial personality disorder as well as substance use disorders are more common in men. Many mood disorders, anxiety disorders, and eating disorders are more common in women. One explanation is that men tend to externalize stress while women tend to internalize it. Gender differences vary to some degree for different cultures.

Men and women do not differ on their overall rates of psychopathology; however, certain disorders are more prevalent in women, and vice versa. Women have higher rates of anxiety and depression (internalizing disorders) and men have higher rates of substance abuse and antisocial disorders (externalizing disorders). It is believed that divisions of power and the responsibilities set upon each sex are critical to this predisposition. Namely, women earn less money than men do, they tend to have jobs with less power and autonomy, and women are more responsive to problems of people in their social networks. These differences can contribute to women's predisposition to anxiety and depression. It is suggested that socializing practices that encourage high self-regard and mastery would benefit the mental health of both women and men.

=== Anxiety and depression ===
One study interviewed 18,572 respondents, aged 18 and over, about 15 phobic symptoms. These symptoms would yield diagnoses based on criteria for agoraphobia, social phobia, and simple phobia. Women had significantly higher prevalence rates of agoraphobia and simple phobia; however, there were no differences found between men and women in social phobia. The most common phobias for both women and men involved spiders, bugs, mice, snakes, and heights. The biggest differences between men and women in these disorders were found on the agoraphobic symptoms of "going out of the house alone" and "being alone", and on two simple phobic symptoms, involving the fear of "any harmless or dangerous animal" and "storms", with relatively more women having both phobias. There were no differences in the age of onset, reporting a fear on the phobic level, telling a doctor about symptoms, or the recall of past symptoms. However, men typically have higher depression, anxiety, and mental illness due to a lack of male reports and men typically concealing their emotions instead of reporting them

Women are more likely than men to have depression. One 1987 study found little empirical support for several proposed explanations, including biological ones, and argued that when depressed women tend to ruminate which may lower the mood further while men tend to distract themselves with activities. This may develop from women and men being raised differently.

=== Suicide ===
Although women have more suicidal thoughts and attempts, and are diagnosed with depression more than men, men are much more likely to die from suicide. Suicide from men happens 4 times more often than among women. Men also have higher levels of suicidal intent than women. Even though women try to commit suicide more often, men choose more violent methods, like guns. Women are more likely to use different methods like drug overdose or poison. One proposed cause for these disparities is socialization: men are expected to be independent and discouraged from showing weakness or emotion, while women are encouraged to share emotions and rely on support from others. Other suggested factors are societal expectations linking men's worth to their ability to provide and men's higher rate of alcoholism.

=== Schizophrenia ===
Women and men are both equally likely at developing symptoms of schizophrenia, but the onset occurs earlier for men. It has been suggested that sexually dimorphic brain anatomy, the differential effects of estrogens and androgens, and the heavy exposure of male adolescents to alcohol and other toxic substances can lead to this earlier onset in men. Various neurodevelopmental theories suggest the reasoning behind an earlier onset for men. One theory suggests that male fetal brains are more vulnerable to prenatal complications. Another theory argues that the gender differentiation in schizophrenia onset is due to excessive pruning of synaptic nerves during male adolescence. "The estrogen hypothesis" proposes that higher levels of estrogen in women has a protective effect against these prenatal and adolescent complications that may be associated with men having schizophrenia onset earlier. Estrogen can alter post-synaptic signal transduction and inhibit psychotic symptoms. Thus, as women experience lower levels of estrogen during menopause or the menstrual cycle, they can experience greater amounts of psychotic symptoms. In addition, estrogen treatment has yielded beneficial effects in patients with schizophrenia.

=== Autism spectrum disorder ===
The epidemiology of autism spectrum disorder varies amongst males and females. Globally, data isn't available for every individual country, but a worldwide review of epidemiological surveys, found a median of 62 out of 10,000 people have ASD. Amongst 8-year-olds in the United States 1 in 44 children have been identified with autism spectrum disorder, but it is "4 times more common among males than females." According to a research looking at the disparity between the actual prevalence of ASD and what actually gets diagnosed, there is a 2:1 ratio of males to females who are undiagnosed. This same statistic suggests that females have a disadvantage when it comes to being diagnosed and are underrepresented.

The "extreme male brain" or empathizing–systemizing theory views the autism spectrum as an extreme version of male-female differences regarding systemizing and empathizing abilities. It's used to explain the possible reason why males with ASD score higher on systemizing tests than females with ASD.

Symptom presentation in females with ASD is not as noticeable as it is in males. Females are better able to cope with the symptoms and often camouflage to be able to fit in socially and form relationships. Camouflaging has been suggested to be the cause of females with ASD having more emotional distress, while male counterparts usually had more external social problems.

The imprinted brain hypothesis argues that autism and psychosis are contrasting disorders on a number of different variables and that this is caused by an unbalanced genomic imprinting favoring paternal genes (autism) or maternal genes (psychosis). According to the Female Protective Effect Hypothesis, for females to develop autism they need to have acquired a wider range of genetic mutations than their male counterpart.

== Possible causes ==
Both biological and social/environmental factors have been studied for their impact on sex differences. Separating biological from environmental effects is difficult, and advocates for biological influences generally accept that social factors are also important.

=== Biological ===
Biological differentiation is a fundamental part of human reproduction. Generally, males have two different sex chromosomes, an X and a Y; females have two X chromosomes. The Y chromosome, or more precisely the SRY gene located on it, is what generally determines sexual differentiation. If a Y chromosome with an SRY gene is present, growth is along male lines; it results in the production of testes, which in turn produce testosterone. In addition to physical effects, this prenatal testosterone increases the likeliness of certain "male" patterns of behavior after birth, though the exact impact and mechanism are not well understood. Parts of the SRY and specific parts of the Y chromosome may also possibly influence different gender behaviors, but if so, these impacts have not yet been identified.

Biological perspectives on psychological differentiation often place parallels to the physical nature of sexual differentiation. These parallels include genetic and hormonal factors that create different individuals, with the main difference being the reproductive function. The brain controls the behavior of individuals, but it is influenced by genes, hormones and evolution. Evidence has shown that the ways that male and female children become adults is different, and that there are variations between the individuals of each sex.

==== Sex linkage ====
Certain psychological traits may be related to the chromosomal sex of the individual. In contrast, there are also "sex-influenced" (or sex-conditioned) traits, in which the same gene may present different phenotypes depending on sex. For example, two siblings might share the same gene of aggressiveness but one might be more docile than the other due to differences in sex. Even in a homozygous dominant or recessive female the condition may not be expressed fully. "Sex-limited" traits are characteristics only expressed in one sex, or only in men or women. They may be caused by genes on either autosomal or sex chromosomes. Evidence exists that there are sex-linked differences between the male and female brain.

==== Epigenetics ====
Epigenetic changes have also been found to cause sex-based differentiation in the brain. The extent and nature of these differences are not fully characterised. Differences in socialization of males and females may decrease or increase the size of sex differences.

=== Neuroscience ===
A 2021 meta-synthesis of existing literature found that sex accounted for 1% of the brain's structure or laterality, finding large group-level differences only in total brain volume. This partially contradicts a review from 2006 and a meta-analysis from 2014 which found that some evidence from brain morphology and function studies indicates that male and female brains cannot always be assumed to be identical from either a structural or functional perspective, and some brain structures are sexually dimorphic.

=== Culture ===
==== Socialization ====
Differences in socialization of males and females are known to cause, decrease, or increase the magnitude of various sex differences. According to social role theory, psychological sex differences arise from the distribution of men and women into different social roles within a society. This distribution leads to the formation of gender roles, which then guide behavior through sex-typed socialization practices and social psychological processes like expectancy confirmation.

In most cultures, humans are subject from infancy to gender socialization. For example, infant girls typically wear pink and infant boys typically wear blue. Gender schemas, or gendered cultural ideals which determine a person's preferences, are also installed into our behaviors beginning at infancy.

As people get older, gender stereotypes become more applied. The social role theory primarily deals with such stereotypes, arguing that a society's division of labor by gender drives psychological gender differences, as individuals adapt to the restrictions or opportunities for their gender. According to this theory, gender roles guide behavior through socialization and social expectations, leading to certain personality traits being more associated with one gender, such as men being more typically assertive and women more passive; ideally, in most cultures, the woman is to stay and tend to the house and home while the man works to both better the house itself and increase finances. When these stereotypes are applied in social settings, such as the workplace, they can often lead to sexism. However, these stereotypes are not necessarily static; people function as implicit role theorists and hold "dynamic stereotypes," believing that a group's characteristics change as their social roles change. For instance, as women's roles have incorporated more paid employment, they are perceived to have adopted more masculine personality attributes over time.

Gender roles vary significantly by culture and time period. Such differences include political rights as well as employment and education opportunities solely available to females. Homosexual people are also subject to various societal expectations. Sexual inversion was one theory of homosexuality, positing that homosexuality was due to an innate reversal of gender traits.

==== Evolutionary product ====
Donald Symons has argued that fundamental sex differences in genetics, hormones and brain structure and function may manifest as distal cultural phenomena (e.g., males as primary combatants in warfare, the primarily female readership of romance novels, etc.). There has been significant feminist critique of these and other evolutionary psychology arguments, from both within and outside of the scientific community.

== See also ==
- Feminization (sociology)
- Feminine psychology
- Locus of control#Gender-based differences
- Male warrior hypothesis
- Sexual dimorphism in human bonding

== Sources ==
- Fine, Cordelia (2010). Delusions of Gender: How Our Minds, Society, and Neurosexism Create Difference. W. W. Norton. ISBN 978-0-393-06838-2.
- Geary, David C. (1998). Male, female: The evolution of human sex differences. American Psychological Association. ISBN 978-1-55798-527-9.
- Halpern, Diane F. (2012). Sex differences in cognitive abilities (4 ed.). London: Routledge. ISBN 978-1-84872-941-4.
- King, Robert C. (2012). A dictionary of genetics (8th ed.). Oxford [u.a.]: Oxford Univ. Press. ISBN 978-0-19-976644-4.
- Lippa, Richard (2005). Gender, Nature, and Nurture (2nd ed.). Psychology Press. ISBN 978-0-8058-5345-2. OCLC 60337744.
- Niedenthal, Paula; Silvia, Krauth-Gruber; Ric, François (2006). Psychology of emotion: interpersonal, experiential, and cognitive approaches. Principles of Social Psychology. New York: Psychology Press. ISBN 1-84169-402-9. OCLC 64208312.
- Oliver, M. B.; Hyde, J. S. (1993). "Gender differences in sexuality: a meta-analysis". Psychological Bulletin. 114 (1): 29–51. doi:10.1037/0033-2909.114.1.29.
- Rudman, Laurie A.; Glick, Peter (2021). The Social Psychology of Gender: How Power and Intimacy Shape Gender Relations. Guilford Publications. ISBN 978-1-4625-0906-5.
