= David De Cremer =

Belgian psychologist (born 1972)

- Born: 1972 (age 53–54); Leuven, Belgium

Academic background
- Education: KU Leuven; University of Cambridge; University of Southampton
- Thesis: Beyond self-interest in social dilemmas: a relational model of co-operation (1999)
- Doctoral advisor: Mark van Vugt

David De Cremer (born 1972) is a Belgian social psychologist examining behavioral applications to organizations, management and economics. In July 2023, he became the dean of Northeastern University's D'Amore-McKim School of Business. In January 2026, Northeastern indicated he would be stepping down as dean on July 1, 2026. He was previously at the University of Cambridge as the KPMG chair in management studies at Judge Business School. Throughout his career he has lived and lectured in Europe, US, Middle-East and Asia. His most recent work focuses on the role of leaders with regards to AI-driven transformation.

== Life and career ==
De Cremer was born in Leuven, Belgium to an upper-class Belgian-German family. He was educated at the University of Leuven, where he obtained a master's degree in social psychology and a bachelor's degree in philosophy. He obtained his Ph.D. in behavioral science at the University of Southampton in 1999. His Ph.D. focused on the psychological determinants of cooperation in economic decision-making games.

In 2009, De Cremer founded the Erasmus Centre of Behavioural Ethics at the Rotterdam School of Management to study why people respond to certain situations outside of accepted moral norms of behavior.

De Cremer is also a visiting professor at London Business School and China Europe International Business School (CEIBS).

In May 2025, De Cremer was filmed sprinting through Northeastern graduation-ceremony crowds as part of a humorous TikTok video that went viral (with more than 6.4 million views as of Feb. 16, 2026).

== Honors ==
In 2011, De Cremer was awarded the ERIM (Erasmus Research Institute of Management; Rotterdam School of Management) “impact on managerial practices” award in the Netherlands for his book on When good people do bad things: On the psychology behind the financial crisis.

De Cremer is an associate editor of the journal Academy of Management Annals. He received the British Psychology Society award for outstanding Ph.D. thesis in social psychology, the Jos Jaspars Early Career award for outstanding contributions to social psychology, the Comenius European Young Psychologist award from the European Federation of Psychologists' Associations, and the Early Career Contribution Award from the International Society for Justice Research. From 2006 to 2011, he was an elected member of the Young Academy of the Royal Dutch Academy of Sciences. In 2013, he was awarded the CEIBS Research Excellence Award (Shanghai, China).

== Bibliography ==
=== Books ===
- De Cremer, David; Zeelenberg, Marcel; Murnighan, John Keith, eds. (2006). Social Psychology and Economics. Psychology Press. ISBN 978-0-8058-5754-2.
- De Cremer, David, ed. (2009). Psychological Perspectives on Ethical Behavior and Decision Making. IAP. ISBN 978-1-60752-276-8.
- De Cremer, David (2011). When Good People Do Bad Things: Illustrations of the Psychology Behind the Financial Crisis. Acco. ISBN 978-90-334-8351-6.
- De Cremer, David; Dick, Rolf Van; Murnighan, John Keith, eds. (2011). Social Psychology and Organizations. Routledge. ISBN 978-1-84872-856-1.
- De Cremer, David; Pillutla, Madan (2012). Making Negotiations Predictable: What Science Tells Us. Springer. ISBN 978-1-137-02479-4.
- De Cremer, David; Tenbrunsel, Ann E., eds. (2012). Behavioral Business Ethics: Shaping an Emerging Field. Routledge. ISBN 978-1-136-63619-6.
- De Cremer, David (2013). The Proactive Leader: How To Overcome Procrastination And Be A Bold Decision-Maker. Springer. ISBN 978-1-137-29027-4.
- Tao, Tian; De Cremer, David; Chunbo, Wu (2016). Huawei: Leadership, Culture, and Connectivity. SAGE Publications. ISBN 978-93-86062-05-5.
- De Cremer, David; McKern, Bruce; McGuire, Jack, eds. (2020). The Belt and Road Initiative: Opportunities and Challenges of a Chinese Economic Ambition. SAGE Publications. ISBN 978-93-5328-791-7.
- De Cremer, David (2020). Leadership by Algorithm: Who Leads and Who Follows in the AI Era?. Harriman House Limited. ISBN 978-0-85719-829-7.
- De Cremer, David, ed. (2021). On the Emergence and Understanding of Asian Global Leadership. Walter de Gruyter GmbH & Co KG. ISBN 978-3-11-067206-0.
- De Cremer, David (2024). The AI-Savvy Leader: Nine Ways to Take Back Control and Make AI Work. Harvard Business Review Press. ISBN 978-1-64782-624-6.

=== Selected publications ===
- De Cremer, David; Van Vugt, Mark (1999). "Social identification effects in social dilemmas: a transformation of motives". European Journal of Social Psychology. 29 (7): 871–893. doi:10.1002/(SICI)1099-0992(199911)29:7<871::AID-EJSP962>3.0.CO;2-I. ISSN 0046-2772.
- Cremer, David De; Knippenberg, Daan van (2004). "Leader self-sacrifice and leadership effectiveness: The moderating role of leader self-confidence". Organizational Behavior and Human Decision Processes. 95 (2): 140–155. doi:10.1016/j.obhdp.2004.04.002.
- De Cremer, David; Tyler, Tom R. (2007). "The effects of trust in authority and procedural fairness on cooperation". Journal of Applied Psychology. 92 (3): 639–649. doi:10.1037/0021-9010.92.3.639. ISSN 1939-1854.
- De Cremer, David (2012). "Leaders need a lesson in crisis management". Financial Times.
- De Cremer, David (2015). "Understanding Trust, In China and the West". Harvard Business Review. ISSN 0017-8012.
- van Gils, Suzanne; Van Quaquebeke, Niels; van Knippenberg, Daan; van Dijke, Marius; De Cremer, David (2015). "Ethical leadership and follower organizational deviance: The moderating role of follower moral attentiveness". The Leadership Quarterly. 26 (2): 190–203. doi:10.1016/j.leaqua.2014.08.005.
- Stouten, Jeroen; Rousseau, Denise M.; De Cremer, David (2018). "Successful Organizational Change: Integrating the Management Practice and Scholarly Literatures". Academy of Management Annals. 12 (2): 752–788. doi:10.5465/annals.2016.0095. ISSN 1941-6520.
- De Cremer, David; Moore, Celia (2020). "Toward a Better Understanding of Behavioral Ethics in the Workplace". Annual Review of Organizational Psychology and Organizational Behavior. 7 (1): 369–393. doi:10.1146/annurev-orgpsych-012218-015151. ISSN 2327-0608.
- De Cremer, David; Kasparov, Garry (2021). "AI Should Augment Human Intelligence, Not Replace It". Harvard Business Review. ISSN 0017-8012.
- De Cremer, David; Bianzino, Nicola Morini; Falk, Ben (2023). "How Generative AI Could Disrupt Creative Work". Harvard Business Review. ISSN 0017-8012.
- Riedl, Christoph; De Cremer, David (2025). "AI for collective intelligence". Collective Intelligence. 4 (2). doi:10.1177/26339137251328909. ISSN 2633-9137.
