= Shame-stroke =

Act of removing or stabbing a man's buttocks

Shame-stroke (Old Norse: klámhogg) is the act of cutting off or stabbing a man's buttocks. It symbolizes the anal rape of a man and is designed not only to be debilitating, but also to be sexually humiliating, through the symbolic feminization of the victim (usually a vanquished enemy), by turning him into an ergi. The injury was considered a mortal wound, as such was ranked with brain injury, a marrow injury, and other fatal wounds. It was considered symbolic of the loss of power in the Norse society where power and status were important as well as an outward signifier of the physical and social power that the dominator wielded over the dominated.

The term is Nordic in origin, and equated with castration as "unmanning" the victim, and classed with wounds that cause major penetrations of the body, strongly suggesting that the term refers to rape or forced anal sex. It was considered a legal term, with the shame entailed associated with the shame of ragr. The "unmanning" also often came with an insulting cognomen indicating status degradation and once the name stuck, ensured that the shame would not be forgotten.

== See also ==
- Scalping
- Viking raid warfare and tactics
