= Excimer laser trabeculostomy =

Minimally invasive glaucoma surgery

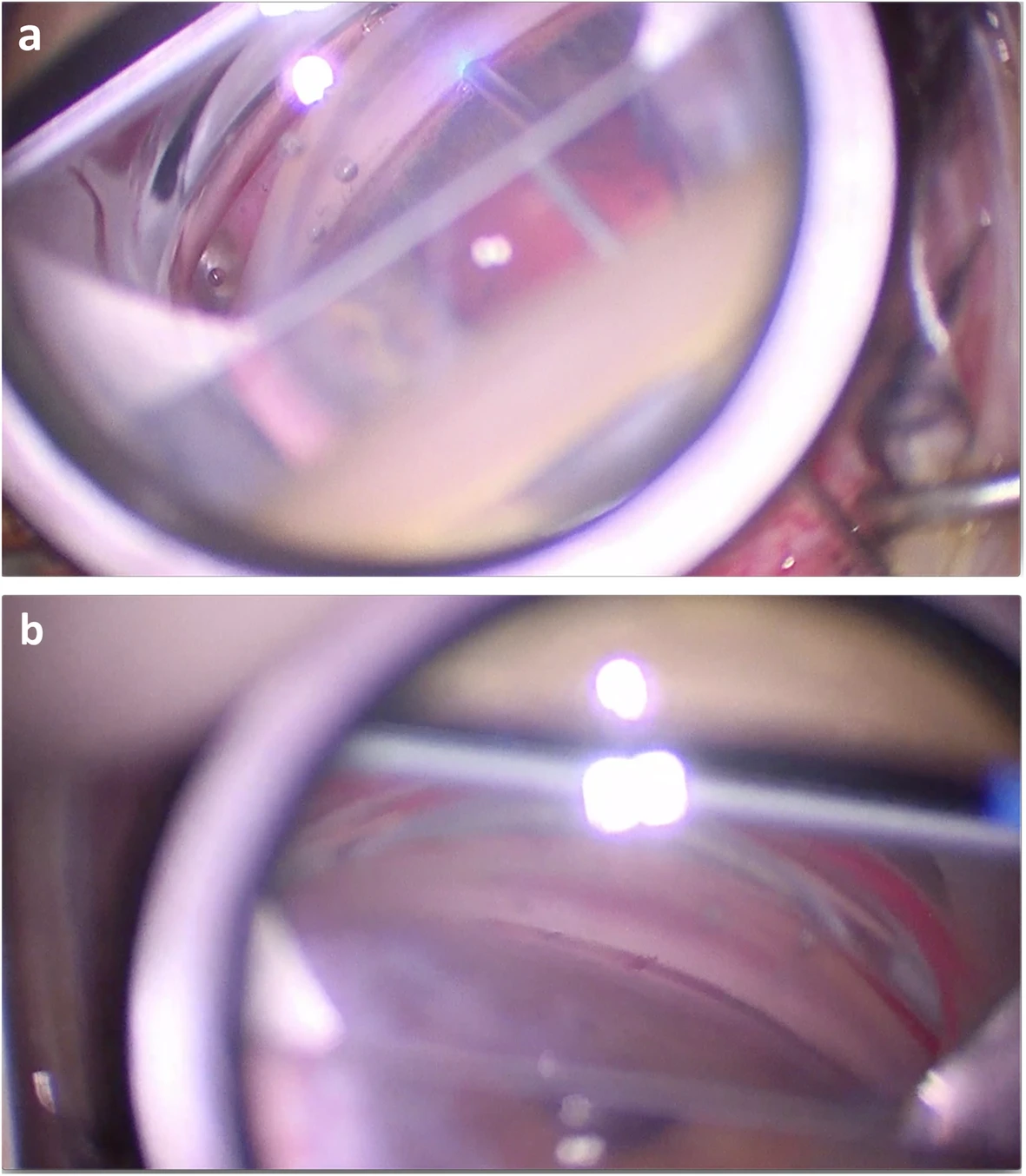
- Gonioscopic view of excimer laser trabeculostomy. View of the probe contacting the trabecular meshwork (a) and the subsequent trabeculostomy openings with bubble formation (b).
- Specialty: Ophthalmology

Excimer laser trabeculostomy (ELT) is a procedure to create holes in the trabecular meshwork to reduce intraocular pressure. It uses a XeCl 308 nm excimer laser. It is considered a minimally invasive glaucoma surgeries, and was first described in 1987 by Michael Berlin.

Alternative treatments for glaucoma include mechanical drilling, thermal lasers, thermal cauterisation, and tube implants. However, these approaches typically disrupt the eye tissue enough to cause inflammation which often outweighs the benefit of the procedure. Excimer laser trabeculostomy uses cold lasers which reduces tissue fibrosis otherwise caused by excimer lasers. A 2020 review of 8 studies found the procedure reduced intraocular pressure by 20-40% and generally had favourable outcomes for reducing glaucoma medication needs.
