= Electronic lien and title =

US program on electronic exchange

Electronic lien and title, also known as ELT, is a program offered by various US States allowing for the electronic exchange of lien and title information with lienholders in lieu of a paper certificate of title.

== Standards ==
The American Association of Motor Vehicle Administrators (AAMVA) created a 'standard' that many states have adopted in ELT design. States that use the AAMVA standard include: Arizona, Hawaii, Massachusetts, Michigan, Ohio, South Carolina, Texas, Virginia. States that have chosen not to use the AAMVA standard have developed their own proprietary system.

== Benefits of ELT for jurisdictions ==
ELT offers improved data accuracy resulting from the electronic exchange of data (reduction in typographical errors) and improved timeliness of data exchange (no more waiting for the mail and faster lien releases) as well as improved data and forms security. There may be a reduction in the use and control of secure forms (paper costs) and in mailing and printing costs.

== Benefits of ELT for the lienholder ==
ELT offers a potential staff reduction in areas associated with filing, retrieval and mailing of certificates and a reduction of storage space needed for filing and storing paper certificates of title. There is increased ease of processing for dealer transactions. It may offer a reduction in title-related fraud.

== Drawbacks ==
A drawback of ELT is that a holder cannot convert ELT to paper on a same-day basis in the majority of ELT states. Some states do offer an option for expedited printing. For example, in Ohio, a vehicle owner who wishes to sell a car that has an ELT must first have the lien released by paying the lienholder the remaining amount owed on the lien. The lienholder then releases their lien electronically which allows the customer to pick up the title directly from the Ohio BMV on the following business day. Some states may take up to three months for a paper title to be produced after an electronic lien release, though this is uncommon.

== Implementation in the United States ==
Several states have implemented compulsory ELT schemes:

- Arizona: May 31, 2010
- California: January 1, 2013
- Florida: January 1, 2013
- Georgia: January 1, 2013
- Indiana: 2022
- Louisiana: January 1, 2010
- Maryland: 2021
- Massachusetts: 1997
- Michigan: 2021
- Nevada: October 1, 2016
- North Carolina: July 1, 2016
- Pennsylvania: July 1, 2008
- South Carolina: 2007
- Virginia: 2015
- West Virginia: 2022
