= Followership =

Actions of someone in a subordinate role

Followership are the actions of someone in a subordinate role. It may also be considered as particular services that can help the leader, a role within a hierarchical organization, a social construct that is integral to the leadership process, or the behaviors engaged in while interacting with leaders in an effort to meet organizational objectives. As such, followership is best defined as an intentional practice on the part of the subordinate to enhance the synergetic interchange between the follower and the leader.

In organizations, “leadership is not just done by the leader, and followership is not just done by followers.” This perspective suggests that leadership and followership do not operate on one continuum, with one decreasing while the other increases. Rather, each dimension exists as a discrete dimension, albeit with some shared competencies.

The study of followership is an emerging area within the leadership field that helps explain outcomes. Specifically, followers play important individual, relational, and collective roles in organizational failures and successes. “If leaders are to be credited with setting the vision for the department or organization and inspiring followers to action, then followers need to be credited with the work that is required to make the vision a reality.”

The term follower can be used as a personality type, as a position in a hierarchy, as a role, or as a set of traits and behaviors. Studies of followership have produced various theories including trait, behavioral attributes, role, and constructionist theories in addition to exploring myths or misunderstandings about followership.

== History ==
The relationship between leader/follower is ancient and is referenced throughout history. Examples of leader/follower partnerships are present in the great literatures and wisdom traditions of China such as the I Ching (1000-750 BC), India, and the aboriginal myths of Africa, Australia and the Native Peoples of North and South America. The best known advice from ancient philosophers came from Aristotle who believed, “He who cannot be a good follower cannot be a leader.” In his time, Aristotle perceived that followership was necessary, albeit mainly as a precursor to what he considered to be a more important role: leader.

Baldasar Castiglione wrote about followers, following and followership in The Book of the Courtier in 1516. During Japan's Edo or Tokugawa period (1603–1868), the Samurai were a class of followers – the very name samurai meant those who served.

In the modern era, followership research began with Mary Parker Follett (1868–1933) who believed that all individuals, regardless of their place in society, deserved respect. She wanted to give more power to individuals and ensure that individuals’ voices were not only heard but were also integrated into solutions. Not only were many of her ideas rejected in the 1930s and 1940s, later theorists also paid limited recognition to her work. Follett's writings have also been underappreciated in contemporary research, despite the fact that her work served as a prelude to many of the developments in the management literature and are still considered timely and insightful by many. Management theorist Warren Bennis said of Follett's work, "Just about everything written today about leadership and organizations comes from Mary Parker Follett's writings and lectures."

Followership research continued in 1955 when Hollander and Webb (1955) argued that leader and follower was not an either/or proposition in which leaders and followers were found at opposite ends of a continuum. They proposed that the qualities associated with leadership and followership were interdependent. Zelaznik published work in 1964 that focused on the leader-follower relationship by considering the dimensions of dominance vs. submissiveness and activity vs. passivity. Followers have been largely neglected in the study of leadership, an omission addressed by Robert Kelley in his seminal 1988 Harvard Business Review article “In Praise of Followers”. Kelley subsequently wrote The Power of Followership (1992), which preceded and influenced Chaleff (1995), Potter, et al. (1996), Thody (2000), Meilinger (2001), Latour and Rast (2004), Kellerman, (2007), Bossily (2007), and Hurwitz & Hurwitz (2015).

In 1994 the W.K. Kellogg Foundation provided a four-year grant to study leadership that attracted 50 practitioners and scholars to “shed light on some of the most compelling topics in the field.” Three focus groups emerged from the Kellogg Leadership Studies Project (KLSP), one being the Leadership and Followership Focus Group. The conveners of this group were Ed Hollander and Lynn Offermann who published a bound collection of papers called The Balance of Leadership & Followership.

The next major organized activity to bring scholars and practitioners together on the subject of followership occurred in 2008 at Claremont University, chaired by Jean Lipman-Blumen of the Peter Drucker and Mastoshi Ito Graduate School of Management, Ron Riggio of the Kravis Leadership Center and Ira Chaleff, author of The Courageous Follower. Participants included researchers and practitioners mentioned in this article including Robert Kelley, Barbara Kellerman and others. In addition to focusing on the elevating aspects of followership, research was introduced on the problematic aspects of followership including the work of Thomas Blass on the famous Stanley Milgram experiments on obedience and by Jean Lipman-Blumen on why we follow toxic leaders. The book of essays by conference contributors, The Art of Followership, was published as part of the Warren Bennis Leadership Series with a foreword by James MacGregor Burns.

Participants in the KLSP went on to form the International Leadership Association (ILA) as a vehicle for keeping the dialogue alive. Similarly, participants in the Claremont conference went on to form the Followership Learning Community within the ILA with Ira Chaleff as its first chair. Both of these entities are continuing with this work.

Additional areas of followership that have been studied include:

- Upwards impression management – influencing management through persuasion and other tactics,
- Organizational citizenship behaviors – examples of this include civic virtue, sportsmanship, or helping others,
- Proactive personality theory – the idea that people can influence and shape their own environment,
- Leader-member exchange or LMX – the interchange and relationships between a leader and follower.

Missing from the present research are additional critical components of followership such as the ability to convert strategies into actions that deliver on the actual intent.

== Followership in organizations ==
=== In the military ===
Military perspectives behaviors such as: knows themselves and seeks self-improvement, is technically and tactically proficient, complies with orders and initiates appropriate actions in the absence of orders, develops a sense of responsibility and takes responsibility for own actions, makes sound and timely decisions or recommendations, sets the example for others, is familiar with their leader and their job, and anticipates their requirements, keeps leader informed, understands the task and ethically accomplishes it, a team member, not a yes man. The U.S. Army has produced a new military doctrine called mission command that highlights the role of followers. It acknowledges one of Colin Powell's principles of leadership that "the commander in the field is always right and the rear echelon is wrong, unless proven otherwise." Mission command doctrine was conceived from a wartime environment that enables followers in the field to act according to the dictates of the situation on the ground, giving them maximum discretion. In order to exercise mission command appropriately, commanders must embrace the principles of followership to succeed.

=== In the nursing profession ===
It is vital to understand that, without effective followers in nursing, our leaders face severe limitations. Current leaders and educators must share and promote the vision of enlightened followership if nursing is to achieve its potential. Research suggests that there is significant difference in organizational effectiveness among nurses with different followership styles – passive, alienated, conformist, pragmatist, or effective.

=== In education and the classroom ===
The appearance of followership in mainstream leadership education books has become more commonplace, including the works of Kouzes & Posner (2012), Jackson & Parry (2011), and Hurwitz & Hurwitz (2015)

Effective followership training in the classroom is challenging because of media messages that preference leadership, internal schemas held by students that ignore followership, and cultural biases against it. Undergraduate and graduate students have been resistant to the idea of followership and followership has been interpreted as leadership poorly enacted or as settling for a lesser position. In recent years, attitudes have begun to change and students have noted that following is an expected, healthy part of a reciprocal relationship in social media and that it did not carry negative connotations.

Although a student's contribution in the classroom has such high significance, the college admissions system has yet to find a way to recognize and reward students who have continuously made these contributions. Given that outstanding classroom contributions have been ignored, yet play such a vital role, it is the responsibility of the college admissions system to find a way to identify them.

=== In the franchising business model ===
Followership, as defined by Hurwitz (2008), is “accepting or enabling [italics original] the goal achievement of one's leader” (p. 11). In the context of franchising, the franchisee could be seen as a follower because he or she accepts the franchisor's business idea and enables the franchisor's goal achievement through the individual franchise operations. Leaders can begin by building organizational value for followers and followership; value is a process of incorporating the concept of followership into the organization's culture, policies, and practices. Because leaders [franchisors] have followers [franchisees] it is their responsibility to set a vision, build trust, and inspire the followers with passion and hope.

=== In the hospitality industry ===
In hospitality and tourism, being an effective follower is important for achieving the service-oriented goals of many operations. In hospitality operations it is often important for followers to work independently of their leaders to carry out important tasks. It has been suggested that incorporating followership into training and education in intentional, purposeful ways could assist operations in hospitality and tourism.

=== Followership Learning Community of the International Leadership Association ===
The Followership Learning Community (FLC) is a learning community within the International Leadership Organization (ILA) and is “dedicated to the development of knowledge, competencies, and programs concerning the leader-follower relationship. It is the first such academic or practice community devoted to the study of followership. It focuses on research, collaboration, and dissemination of ideas and information”. The current priorities of the FLC are to:

- Help advance followership to a mainstream idea
- Generate greater interest in followership studies
- Develop a network of scholars who focus on leader-follower relationships
- Create a practitioner network of consultants/leaders who employ leader-follower best practices
- Support scholars and practitioners seeking to learn more about followership

== Models of followership ==
| Author | Summary |
|---|---|
| Robert Kelley | According to Kelley, effective followers are individuals who are enthusiastic, intelligent, ambitious, and self-reliant. Kelley identified two underlying behavioral dimensions that distinguish types of followers. The first behavioral dimension is the degree to which the individual is an independent, critical thinker. The second dimension is the degree to which the individual is active or passive. Depending on where a person falls on these two dimensions, there are five different follower types: The Sheep (low independence, passive): These individuals require external motivation and constant supervision.; The Yes-People (low independence, active): These conformists are committed to the leader and the goal (or task) of the organization (or group/team) and will defend adamantly their leader when faced with opposition from others. They do not question the decisions or actions of the leader.; The Pragmatics (average on both dimensions): These individuals are not trail-blazers; they will not stand behind controversial or unique ideas until the majority of the group has expressed their support and often prefer to stay in the background.; The Alienated (high independence, passive): These individuals are negative and often attempt to stall or bring the group down by constantly questioning the decisions and actions of the leader.; The Star Followers (high independence, active): These exemplary followers are positive, active, and independent thinkers. Star followers will not blindly accept the decisions or actions of a leader until they have evaluated them completely but can be trusted to get the job done. |
| Ira Chaleff | Chaleff's original model of Courageous Followership proposed four dimensions in which courageous followers operates within a group, and a fifth dimension in which the follower operates either within or outside the group depending on the response of the leadership. The dimensions of courageous followership are: Assume responsibility: They assume responsibility for themselves and the organization. They do not expect the leader or organization to provide for their security and growth, or need permission to act. Courageous followers discover and create opportunities to fulfill their potential and maximize their value to the organization. They initiate values-based action to improve the organization's external activities and its internal processes.; To serve: Courageous followers are unafraid of the hard work required to serve a leader. They assume new or additional responsibilities, stay alert for areas in which their strengths complement the leader's, and assert themselves in these areas. Courageous followers stand up for their leader and the tough decisions a leader must make if the organization is to achieve its purpose. They are as passionate as the leader in pursuing the common purpose.; To challenge: Courageous followers give voice to the discomfort they feel when the behaviors or policies of the leader or group conflict with their sense of what is right. They are willing to stand up, to stand out, to risk rejection, to initiate conflict in order to examine the actions of the leader and group when appropriate. They are willing to deal with the emotions their challenge evokes in the leader and group. Courageous followers value organizational harmony and their relationship with the leader, but not at the expense of the common purpose and their integrity.; To participate in transformation: Courageous followers champion the need for change and stay with the leader and group while they mutually struggle with the difficulty of real change. They examine their own need for transformation and become full participants in the change process as appropriate.; To take moral action: Courageous followers know when it is time to take a stand that is different than that of the leader's The stand may involve refusing to obey a direct order, appealing the order to the next level of authority, or tendering one's resignation. These and other forms of moral action involve personal risk, but service to the common purpose justifies and sometimes demands acting. If attempts to redress the morally objectionable situation fail, a follower faces the more difficult prospect of whether to become a whistleblower. |
| Barbara Kellerman | Barbara Kellerman categorized followers as isolates, bystanders, participants, activists, and diehards based on their level of engagement in the leadership process.: Isolates: Isolates are completely detached. They do not care about their leaders, know anything about them, or respond to them in any way. Their alienation is, nevertheless, of consequence.; Bystanders: Bystanders observe but do not participate. They make a deliberate decision to stand aside, to disengage from their leaders and from whatever is the group dynamic.; Participants: Participants are engaged in some way. They either clearly favor or oppose their leaders, groups, and organizations of which they are members. In either case, they invest resources to try and make an impact.; Activists: Activists feel strongly about their leaders and act accordingly. They are eager, energetic, and engaged. Because they are heavily invested in people and processes, they work hard either on behalf of their leaders or to undermine and even unseat them.; Diehards: Diehards are, as their name implies, prepared to die if necessary for their cause, whether it is an individual, an idea, or both. Diehards are deeply devoted to their leaders; or, in contrast, they are ready to remove them from positions of power, authority, and influence by any means necessary. In either case, Diehards are defined by their dedication including their willingness to risk life and limb. Being a Diehard is all-consuming. |
| Hurwitz & Hurwitz | The Generative Partnership Model ® comprises five guiding principles, five skill pairings, and an array of associated behaviors. The guiding principles are at the core of every partnership, team, and organization, providing a framework on which the skills are used. The skills come in matched pairs: each of the five skill pairings involves a multitude of associated behaviors. The behaviors could be considered best practice, but are better considered adaptive and adaptable. Hurwitz and Hurwitz described these five skills of good followership: Decision advocating: Adding value to decision making when it is not your decision to make.; Peak performing: Taking initiative for your own engagement, development, and on-the-job performance.; Organizational agility: Aligning and thriving within the broader organization including being able to adapt to the norms of different subunits.; Dashboard communicating: Keeping your partner well informed and stimulating the right leadership action.; Relationship building: Developing rapport, trust, and an understanding of how to work best with leadership; The five complementary areas of leadership skill are: Decision framing: Creating an environment and process that optimizes collaboration and decision quality.; Performance coaching: Ensuring an environment of purpose, progress, and positivity.; Organizational mentoring: Helping to guide others on how best to navigate and operate organizationally.; Cascade communicating: Keeping team members informed and stimulating the right followership initiative.; Relationship framing: Creating a comfortable, professional, equitable environment for each team member. |
| Boas Shamir | Shamir looks at the different types of leader-follower theoretical perspectives rather than developing a specific model of positive followership.: Followers as recipients of leadership: A leader's behavior (e.g., articulating a vision, setting a personal example, intellectual stimulation) affects followers’ attitudes and behaviors such as commitment to the organization, or exerting extra effort at work. According to this view followers do not play an active role in the leadership process.; Followers as moderators of leadership impact: the leader's influence on the followers’ attitudes and performances depends on the followers’ characteristics.; Followers as substitutes for leadership: There are certain conditions that can neutralize or negate the need for leadership. The theory emphasizes followers’ training, experience, and job related knowledge.; Followers as constructors of leadership: A much more central and explicit role is given to followers in theories that present leadership as cognitively or socially constructed by followers.; Followers as leaders – shared leadership: This perspective questions the usefulness of the distinction between leaders and followers. |
| Coyne & Coyne | Coyne and Coyne (2007) proposed seven desirable followership actions from the perspective of a CEO and his or her direct reports: 1. Show your goodwill; 2. Leave your baggage at the door; 3. Study the CEOS's working style; 4. Understand the CEO's agenda; 5. Present a realistic and honest game plan; 6. Be on your “A” game; and, 7. Offer objective options. |
| Jimmy Collins | Jimmy L.S. Collins, retired President and COO of Chick-fil-A, an Atlanta, Georgia USA, based Quick Service Restaurant franchise, refers to his philosophy as Creative Followership. He wrote that being a follower is an active role requiring a great deal of creativity, personal initiative, and the ability to execute tasks with excellence. The process begins with identifying a leader worth following. Even so, when Collins’ suggests that people choose their boss, he gives credibility to followers as more than merely people who work for someone. Rather, he proposes that followers have skills, ideas, and energies that complement those of the leader. As a result, a relationship is created in which leaders and followers are able to achieve much more than each individual could have accomplished alone. |
| Susan Cain | Susan Cain (2017) states that, “Our elite schools over emphasize leadership partly because they're preparing students for the corporate world, and they assume that this is what businesses need and what leads to personal success. But a discipline in organizational psychology, called “followership” is gaining in popularity.” |
| Adam Grant | The most frequent questions he is asked by people is how to contribute when they are not in charge but have suggestions and want to be heard. He calls these “fundamental questions of followership." |
| Krista Kleiner | Kleiner proposes that colleges focus on followership skills and contributions. In short, college admission officers need to place less emphasis on students’ acquisition of leadership titles throughout high school and place more emphasis on understanding the domain that has been central to their lives—the classroom learning environment and their contributions to it. If teachers encouraged followership, she posits, they would find ways of improving their classes and also contribute to their students’ becoming both good leaders and followers. By helping students do this, teachers are helping the future working generation of Americans develop skills critical not only to the workplace but to our society as a whole. |
| Gordon Curphy, Mark Roellig | The Curphy-Roellig Followership Model builds on some of the earlier research of Hollander, Chaleff, Kellerman and Kelley and consists of two independent dimensions and four followership types. The two dimensions of the Curphy-Roellig model are Critical Thinking and Engagement. Critical thinking is concerned with a follower's ability to challenge the status quo, ask good questions, detect problems, and develop solutions. Engagement is concerned with the level of effort people put forth at work. Based on these two dimensions followers are then categorized into four groups: Slackers (low critical thinking, low engagement), Brown-nosers (low critical thinking, high engagement), Criticizers (high critical thinking, low engagement) and Self-starters (high critical thinking, high engagement). The authors stress a situational nature of the model. |

== Academic followership theories ==
| Theory | Summary |
|---|---|
| Trait | Identifies key traits and their relationship with strong followership. Zaleznik, 1964 (Dominance vs. submissiveness; Activity vs. passivity), Kelley, 1992 (Active engagement; Independent thinking), Chaleff, 1995 (Courage), Potter, et al., 1996 (Relationship initiative; Performance initiative), Kellerman, 2007 (Engagement) |
| Behavioral Attribute | Directly lists the behavioral attributes of good followers. Kelley (1988), Hurwitz & Hurwitz (2015) |
| Role Based Approaches | Role-based views consider how individuals enact leadership and followership in the context of hierarchical roles. The primary purpose is to advance understanding of how subordinates work with managers in ways that contribute to or detract from leadership and organizational outcomes. |
| Constructionism | Investigates how people interact and engage together in social and relational contexts to construct (or not construct) leadership and followership. |
| Distributed Leadership & Followership | Distributed leadership starts with the perspective many people can take on a leadership role, not just those with formal power and authority. Leadership and followership can move from person to person as the dialogue twists and turns. Not only are team members challenged to enact followership and leadership roles effectively, but they must be able to switch between the roles. Generally speaking, however, distributed leadership theories focus exclusively on the leadership role. |
| Leader-Member Exchange Theory | The focus in LMX theory is on how leaders and followers engage together to generate high quality work relationships that allow them to produce effective leadership outcomes. While LMX theory does acknowledge followers in the relational process, it is still more leadership – than followership – focused in that it privileges the leader as the driver of the relationship-building process. |
| Implicit Followership Theories | Follower-centric approaches arose in response to leader-centric views and drew attention to the role of the follower in constructing leaders and leadership. Implicit followership research proposes that leaders’ beliefs for follower behavior influence the extent to which followership is effective; followers who behave as expected will be more successful. They use these schemas to encode followership information, which serves as essential elements of organizational sensemaking. |

Other behavioral traits of effective followership that have been proposed include: a belief in the importance of being a good follower, looks beyond themselves, values their own independence, follows while offering up ideas, self-motivated and self-directed, displays loyalty, considers integrity of paramount importance, functions well in change-oriented environments, functions well on teams, thinks independently and critically, gets involved, generates ideas, willing to collaborate, willing to lead initiatives, develops leaders and themselves, stays current, anticipates, drives own growth, and is a player for all seasons.

== Myths and misconceptions about followership ==
The traditional notion that leaders are active and followers are passive is mistaken and contributes to misconceptions about the organizational functions of superiors and subordinates. Behaviorists now recognize that active followers influence leaders at every level of the hierarchy, and that leadership itself is a process, not a person.

There are many myths about followership:

- It is a lesser role.
- It is just preparation for being a leader.
- It is managing up, brownnosing or ‘being political'.
- Once you are a leader you are no longer a follower.
- You have to be a good follower to be a good leader.
- Following is passive. It's easy.

For more misconceptions, see Part 1 (Chapters 2-4) of Embracing Followership: How to Thrive in a Leader-Centric Culture.

== The future of followership research ==
Followership theory has the potential for reinvigorating leadership research in the following new ways:

- Moves beyond leader-centric views to recognize the importance of follower roles and following behaviors making the leadership process more inclusive.
- Distributes responsibility for constructing leadership and its outcomes to all players in the leadership process.
- Focuses us on identifying more and less effective followership behaviors.
- Embeds context within the leadership process.
- Recognizes that leadership can flow in all directions, e.g., not only downward but also upward in a hierarchy when subordinates engage in leading behaviors.
- Allows us to understand why and how managers are not always effective leaders, such as when they are unable to co-construct leadership with their subordinates.
- Promotes followership development, not just leadership development.

Robert Kelley proposes seven areas for further followership research:

1. World Events
2. Culture
3. Leader(ship)
4. Follower qualities
5. Role of the Follower
6. Language of followership
7. Courageous Conscience

He challenges the field to focus followership research more on “the big issues happening in the world” such as suicide bombers, religious fundamentalism, democratically elected dictators and corporate abuses of power.

Chaleff calls for a similar focus for research on susceptibility to extremism and the use and development of assessments to help people understand their own tendencies in order to pre-empt their expression in the presence of toxic leaders.
